= Praspel =

- Paradigm: contract
- Developer: Ivan Enderlin, Frédéric Dadeau, Abdallah Ben Othman, Alain Giorgetti, Fabrice Bouquet
- OS: all
- License: New BSD License
- Website: hoa-project.net

Major implementations
- PHP

Influenced by
- JML, ACSL

Praspel (PHP Realistic Annotation and Specification Language) is a formal specification language for PHP. It is based on the design-by-contract paradigm and uses preconditions, postconditions, invariants etc. Specifications are written in the comments of the PHP code (always accessible). Praspel is used for manual or automatic software validation and verification, thanks to realistic domains.

== Bibliography ==
- Enderlin, Ivan; Dadeau, Frédéric; Giorgetti, Alain; Bouquet, Fabrice (2012). "Grammar-Based Testing Using Realistic Domains in PHP". In Antoniol, Giuliano; Bertolino, Antonia; Labiche, Yvan (eds.). Fifth IEEE International Conference on Software Testing, Verification and Validation, ICST 2012, Montreal, QC, Canada, April 17-21, 2012. IEEE Computer Society. pp. 509–518. doi:10.1109/ICST.2012.136. ISBN 978-0-7695-4670-4.
- Enderlin, Ivan; Dadeau, Frédéric; Giorgetti, Alain; Othman, Abdallah Ben (2011). "Praspel: A Specification Language for Contract-Based Testing in PHP". In Wolff, Burkhart; Zaïdi, Fatiha (eds.). Testing Software and Systems: 23rd IFIP WG 6.1 International Conference, ICTSS 2011, Paris, France, November 7-10, 2011, Proceedings. Lecture Notes in Computer Science. Vol. 7019. Springer. pp. 64–79. doi:10.1007/978-3-642-24580-0_6. ISBN 978-3-642-24579-4.
- Enderlin, Ivan; Ben Othman, Abdallah; Dadeau, Frédéric; Giorgetti, Alain (September 2010). "Realistic Domains for Unit Tests Generation" (PDF).
