= Assertion definition language =

The Assertion Definition Language (ADL) is a specification language providing a predicate logic based behaviour, as well as interfaces, for computer software.

== English language support ==
ADL uses function pre- and postconditions to specify interfaces and is designed to provide an intermediary between informal English language specifications and formal programmatic test specifications.

Tool support exists both to convert ADL specifications into the English language, and to generate test systems against which implementation code can be verified.

== History ==
ADL is developed cooperatively by The Open Group and SunTest of Sun Microsystems

== See also ==
- Formal methods
- Formal specification
