= Refinement (computing) =

Refinement is a generic term of computer science that encompasses various approaches for producing correct computer programs and simplifying existing programs to enable their formal verification.

== Program refinement ==
In formal methods, program refinement is the verifiable transformation of an abstract (high-level) formal specification into a concrete (low-level) executable program. Stepwise refinement allows this process to be done in stages. Logically, refinement normally involves implication, but there can be additional complications.

The progressive just-in-time preparation of the product backlog (requirements list) in agile software development approaches, such as Scrum, is also commonly described as refinement.

== Data refinement ==
Data refinement is used to convert an abstract data model (in terms of sets for example) into implementable data structures (such as arrays). Operation refinement converts a specification of an operation on a system into an implementable program (e.g., a procedure). The postcondition can be strengthened and/or the precondition weakened in this process. This reduces any nondeterminism in the specification, typically to a completely deterministic implementation.

For example, x ∈ {1,2,3} (where x is the value of the variable x after an operation) could be refined to x ∈ {1,2}, then x ∈ {1}, and implemented as x := 1. Implementations of x := 2 and x := 3 would be equally acceptable in this case, using a different route for the refinement. However, we must be careful not to refine to x ∈ {} (equivalent to false) since this is unimplementable; it is impossible to select a member from the empty set.

The term reification is also sometimes used (coined by Cliff Jones). Retrenchment is an alternative technique when formal refinement is not possible. The opposite of refinement is abstraction.

== Refinement calculus ==
Refinement calculus is a formal system (inspired from Hoare logic) that promotes program refinement. The FermaT Transformation System is an industrial-strength implementation of refinement. The B-Method is also a formal method that extends refinement calculus with a component language: it has been used in industrial developments.

== Refinement types ==
In type theory, a refinement type is a type endowed with a predicate which is assumed to hold for any element of the refined type. Refinement types can express preconditions when used as function arguments or postconditions when used as return types: for instance, the type of a function which accepts natural numbers and returns natural numbers greater than 5 may be written as $f: \mathbb{N} \rarr \{n: \mathbb{N} \, | \, n > 5\}$. Refinement types are thus related to behavioral subtyping.

== See also ==
- Reification (computer science)
