= Java Modeling Language =

Specification language for Java programs

The Java Modeling Language (JML) is a specification language for Java programs, using Hoare style pre- and postconditions and invariants, that follows the design by contract paradigm. Specifications are written as Java annotation comments to the source files, which hence can be compiled with any Java compiler.

Various verification tools, such as a runtime assertion checker and the Extended Static Checker (ESC/Java) aid development.

== Overview ==
JML is a behavioural interface specification language for Java modules. JML provides semantics to formally describe the behavior of a Java module, preventing ambiguity with regard to the module designers' intentions. JML inherits ideas from Eiffel, Larch and the Refinement Calculus, with the goal of providing rigorous formal semantics while still being accessible to any Java programmer. Various tools are available that make use of JML's behavioral specifications. Because specifications can be written as annotations in Java program files, or stored in separate specification files, Java modules with JML specifications can be compiled unchanged with any Java compiler.

== Syntax ==
JML specifications are added to Java code in the form of annotations in comments. Java comments are interpreted as JML annotations when they begin with an @ sign. That is, comments of the form

 //@ <JML specification>

or

 /*@ <JML specification> @*/

Basic JML syntax provides the following keywords

requires
Defines a precondition on the method that follows.
ensures
Defines a postcondition on the method that follows.
signals
Defines a postcondition for when a given Exception is thrown by the method that follows.
signals_only
Defines what exceptions may be thrown when the given precondition holds.
assignable
Defines which fields are allowed to be assigned to by the method that follows.
pure
Declares a method to be side effect free (like assignable \nothing but can also throw exceptions). Furthermore, a pure method is supposed to always either terminate normally or throw an exception.
invariant
Defines an invariant property of the class.
loop_invariant
Defines a loop invariant for a loop.
also
Combines specification cases and can also declare that a method is inheriting specifications from its supertypes.
assert
Defines a JML assertion.
spec_public
Declares a protected or private variable public for specification purposes.

Basic JML also provides the following expressions

\result
An identifier for the return value of the method that follows.
\old(<expression>)
A modifier to refer to the value of the <expression> at the time of entry into a method.
(\forall <decl>; <range-exp>; <body-exp>)
The universal quantifier.
(\exists <decl>; <range-exp>; <body-exp>)
The existential quantifier.
a ==> b
a implies b
a <== b
a is implied by b
a <==> b
a if and only if b

as well as standard Java syntax for logical and, or, and not. JML annotations also have access to Java objects, object methods and operators that are within the scope of the method being annotated and that have appropriate visibility. These are combined to provide formal specifications of the properties of classes, fields and methods. For example, an annotated example of a simple banking class may look like

public class BankingExample { 
    public static final int MAX_BALANCE = 1000; 
    private /*@ spec_public @*/ int balance;
    private /*@ spec_public @*/ boolean isLocked = false; 
 
    //@ public invariant balance >= 0 && balance <= MAX_BALANCE;
 
    //@ assignable balance;
    //@ ensures balance == 0;
    public BankingExample() {
        this.balance = 0;
    }
 
    //@ requires 0 < amount && amount + balance < MAX_BALANCE;
    //@ assignable balance;
    //@ ensures balance == \old(balance) + amount;
    public void credit(final int amount) {
        this.balance += amount;
    }
 
    //@ requires 0 < amount && amount <= balance;
    //@ assignable balance;
    //@ ensures balance == \old(balance) - amount;
    public void debit(final int amount) {
        this.balance -= amount;
    }
 
    //@ ensures isLocked == true;
    public void lockAccount() {
        this.isLocked = true;
    }
 
    //@   requires !isLocked;
    //@   ensures \result == balance;
    //@ also
    //@   requires isLocked;
    //@   signals_only BankingException;
    public /*@ pure @*/ int getBalance() throws BankingException {
        if (!this.isLocked) {
            return this.balance;
        } else {
            throw new BankingException();
        }
    }
}

Full documentation of JML syntax is available in the JML Reference Manual.

== Tool support ==
A variety of tools provide functionality based on JML annotations. The Iowa State JML tools provide an assertion checking compiler jmlc which converts JML annotations into runtime assertions, a documentation generator jmldoc which produces Javadoc documentation augmented with extra information from JML annotations, and a unit test generator jmlunit which generates JUnit test code from JML annotations.

Independent groups are working on tools that make use of JML annotations. These include:

- ESC/Java2 , an extended static checker which uses JML annotations to perform more rigorous static checking than is otherwise possible.
- OpenJML declares itself the successor of ESC/Java2.
- Daikon, a dynamic invariant generator.
- KeY, which provides an open source theorem prover with a JML front-end and an Eclipse plug-in (JML Editing) with support for syntax highlighting of JML.
- Krakatoa, a static verification tool based on the Why verification platform and using the Rocq proof assistant.
- JMLEclipse, a plugin for the Eclipse integrated development environment with support for JML syntax and interfaces to various tools that make use of JML annotations.
- Sireum/Kiasan, a symbolic execution based static analyzer which supports JML as a contract language.
- JMLUnit, a tool to generate files for running JUnit tests on JML annotated Java files.
- TACO, an open source program analysis tool that statically checks the compliance of a Java program against its Java Modeling Language specification.
