= Perfect Developer =

Perfect Developer (PD) is a tool for developing computer programs in a rigorous manner. It is used to develop applications in areas including IT systems and airborne critical systems. The principle is to develop a formal specification and refine the specification to code. Even though the tool is founded on formal methods, the suppliers claim that advanced mathematical knowledge is not a prerequisite.

PD supports the Verified Design by Contract paradigm, which is an extension of Design by contract. In Verified Design by Contract, the contracts are verified by static analysis and automated theorem proving, so that it is certain that they will not fail at runtime.

The Perfect specification language used has an object-oriented style, producing code in programming languages including Java, C# and C++. It has been developed by the UK company Escher Technologies Ltd. They note on their website that their claim is not that the language itself is perfect, but that it can be used to produce code which perfectly implements a precise specification.

== See also ==
- JML
- Safety Integrity Level
