= Key system =

Key System may refer to:

- Key telephone system, a multiline telephone systems typically used in business environments
- Key System, a defunct transportation system in the San Francisco Bay Area
- KeY System, a software verification tool
- a cryptosystem using a Cryptographic key
- system of keys on a flute, such as Boehm or Albert
