= Young–Deruyts development =

In mathematics, the Young–Deruyts development is a method of writing invariants of an action of a group on an n-dimensional vector space V in terms of invariants depending on at most n–1 vectors (Dieudonné & Carrell 1970, 1971, p.36, 39).
