= Michael Butler (computer scientist) =

Irish computer scientist

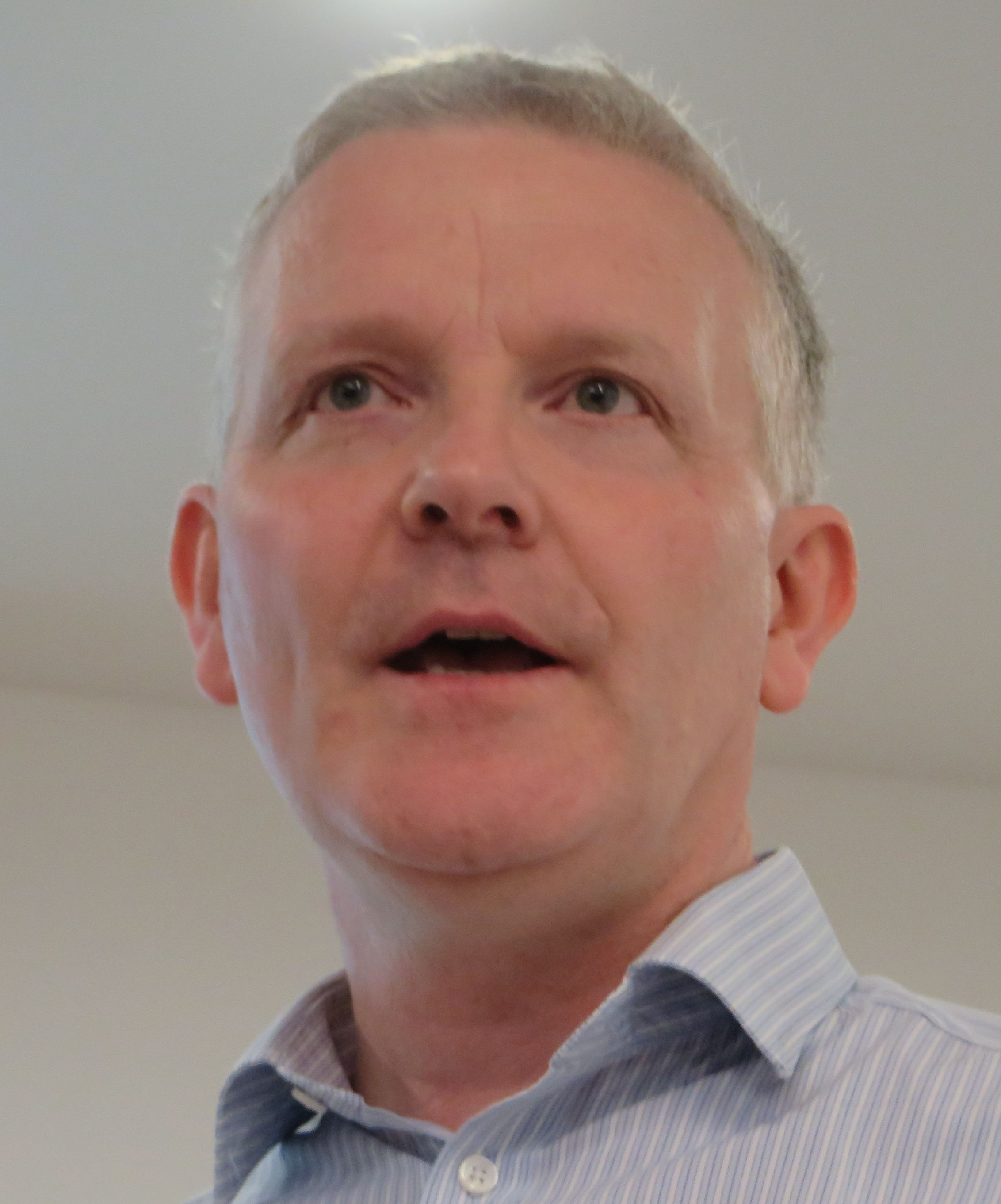
- Michael Butler speaking at the British Computer Society in London, 2015
- Born: Ireland
- Education: Trinity College, Dublin; Wolfson College, Oxford
- Known for: B-Method
- Scientific career
- Fields: Computer science, software engineering, formal methods
- Workplaces: University of Southampton
- Thesis: A CSP Approach To Action Systems (1992)
- Doctoral advisor: Carroll Morgan
- Website: www.ecs.soton.ac.uk/people/mjb

Michael J. Butler is an Irish computer scientist. As of 2022, he is professor of computer science and Dean of the Faculty of Engineering and Physical Sciences at the University of Southampton, England.

== Biography ==
Butler was born in Ireland. He received his bachelor's degree in computer science from Trinity College Dublin in 1988. He then took an MSc (1989) and DPhil (1992) at the Programming Research Group of the University of Oxford, working in the area of communicating sequential processes. He then worked for Broadcom in Dublin and at Åbo Akademi University in Turku, Finland with Ralph-Johan Back on refinement calculus. He joined the University of Southampton in 1995 as a lecturer, rising to reader in 2000 and then professor in the same year. He led the Dependable Systems & Software Engineering group at the School of Electronics and Computer Science, University of Southampton (inactive as of 2022).

His main research is in the area of the B-Method (originated by J.-R. Abrial), especially tool support such as ProB (advanced model checking for B which allows for the simulation of Event-B machines in the Rodin/Eclipse platform), U2B (UML and B), csp2B (CSP and B), and the RODIN toolset for Event-B.
