= Kevin Lano =

British computer scientist

- Born: 1966 (age 59–60); United Kingdom
- Citizenship: British
- Education: University of Reading, University of Bristol
- Known for: Formal methods, Z notation, Z++, UML 2.0, B-Method
- Awards: Ten Year Most Influential Paper Award at the MODELS 2008 Conference
- Scientific career
- Fields: Computer science, software engineering
- Workplaces: University of Oxford, King's College London
- Website: nms.kcl.ac.uk/kevin.lano

Kevin C. Lano (born 1966) is a British computer scientist.

== Life and work ==
Kevin Lano studied at the University of Reading, attaining a first class degree in Mathematics and Computer Science, and the University of Bristol where he completed his doctorate. He was an originator of formal object-oriented techniques (Z++), and developed a combination of UML and formal methods in a number of papers and books. He was one of the founders of the Precise UML group, who influenced the definition of UML 2.0. Lano published the book Advanced Systems Design with Java, UML and MDA (Butterworth-Heinemann, ISBN 0-7506-6496-7) in 2005. He is also the editor of UML 2 Semantics and Applications, published by Wiley in October 2009, among a number of computer science books.

Lano was formerly a Research Officer at the Oxford University Computing Laboratory (now the Oxford University Department of Computer Science). He is a reader at the Department of Informatics at King's College London.

In 2008, Lano and his co-authors Andy Evans, Robert France, and Bernard Rumpe, were awarded the Ten Year Most Influential Paper Award at the MODELS 2008 Conference on Model Driven Engineering Languages and Systems for the 1998 paper "The UML as a Formal Modeling Notation".

== Selected publications ==
- Lano, K. (1991). "Z++, an object-orientated extension to Z". In Nicholls, John (ed.). Z User Workshop, Oxford 1990. Workshops in Computing. Springer. pp. 151–172.
- Evans, A.; France, R.; Lano, K.; Rumpe, B. (1998). "The UML as a Formal Modeling Notation". The Unified Modeling Language. «UML»'98: Beyond the Notation. Lecture Notes in Computer Science. Vol. 1618. Springer-Verlag. pp. 336–348. arXiv:1409.6919. doi:10.1007/978-3-540-48480-6_26. ISBN 978-3-540-66252-5. S2CID 32729.

== Books ==
- Reverse Engineering and Software Maintenance (McGraw-Hill, 1993)
- Object-oriented Specification Case Studies (Prentice Hall, 1993)
- Formal Object-oriented Development (Springer, 1995)
- The B Language and Method: A Guide to Practical Formal Development (Springer, 1996)
- Software Design in Java 2 (Palgrave, 2002)
- UML 2 Semantics and Applications (Wiley, 2009), editor
- Model-Driven Development using UML and Java (Cengage, 2009)
- Agile MBD using UML-RSDS (Taylor & Francis, 2016)
- Financial Software Engineering (Springer, 2019), with Howard Haughton
