= Rodin tool =

Modelling in Event-B

Rodin
- Original author(s): Jean-Raymond Abrial, Michael Butler, et al.
- Developer(s): European Union Projects: RODIN (2004–2007); DEPLOY (2008–2012); ADVANCE (2011–2014)
- Initial release: 2007
- Written in: Java
- Platform: Eclipse IDE
- Type: Software tool
- License: Open source
- Website: www.event-b.org

The Rodin tool is a software tool for formal modelling in Event-B. It was developed as part of several collaborative European Union projects, including initially the RODIN project (2004–2007).

== Overview ==
Event-B is a notation and method developed from the B-Method and is intended to be used with an incremental style of modelling. The idea of incremental modelling has been taken from programming: modern programming languages come with integrated development environment that make it easy to modify and improve programs. The Rodin tool provides such an environment for Event-B. Two characteristics of the Rodin tool are its ease of use and its extensibility.

The tool focuses on modelling. It allows the user to modify models and try out variations of a model. The tool is also extensible. This makes it possible to adapt the tool to specific needs, so the tool can be adapted to fit into existing development processes instead of demanding the opposite. There is an associated Event-B wiki.

Rodin ("Rigorous Open Development Environment for Complex Systems") is an extension of Eclipse IDE (Java-based). The Rodin Eclipse Builder manages the following:

- Well-formedness and type checker
- Proof obligation (PO) generator
- Proof manager (PM)
- Propagation of changes

Rodin Proof Manager (PM)

- PM constructs a proof tree for each PO
- Automatic and interactive modes
- PM manages used hypotheses
- PM calls reasoners to:
  - discharge goal, or
  - split goal into subgoals
- Collection of reasoners:
  - simplifier, rule‐based, decision procedures,
- Basic tactics language to define PM and reasoners

== Industrial applications and case studies ==
The Rodin project included five industrial case studies that served to validate the toolset and helped with the elaboration of an appropriate methodology for using the tools. The case studies were led by industrial partners of the Rodin project, supported by the other partners. The case studies were as follows:

- A failure management system for an engine controller;
- Part of a platform for mobile Internet technology;
- Engineering of communications protocols;
- An air-traffic display system;
- An ambient campus application.

== Some available plug-ins for Rodin ==
- B4free provers
  - Provider: ClearSy
  - Function: Theorem provers
- UML-B
  - Provider: University of Southampton
  - Function: UML-like graphical front-end for Event-B supporting class diagrams and state charts
- ProB
  - Provider: University of Düsseldorf
  - Function: Animation and Model-checking of Event-B models; Counterexamples for false proof goals, in particular, proof obligations
- Brama
  - Provider: ClearSy
  - Function: Animation of B models. The purpose is twofold:
    - Experimentation with a model to observe states and transitions
    - Flash animation of Event-B models
- Modularisation
  - Provider: Newcastle University
  - Function: Structuring Event-B developments into logical units of modelling, called modules; Model composition; Model reuse
