= B notation =

B notation or B-notation may refer to:

- B notation (scientific notation), equivalent to E notation but for base-2 exponents
- B notation (fixed point format), to specify the format of scaled binary fixed-point numbers
- B method, a method of software development
