= CZT =

CZT may stand for:

- Community Z Tools, a set of tools for the Z notation
- Cadmium zinc telluride, a semiconductor material
- Chirp_Z-transform, another name for Bluestein's FFT algorithm
- Changzhutan, Changsha-Zhuzhou-xiangTan City Cluster
