= Marcus Fontoura =

Brazilian computer scientist

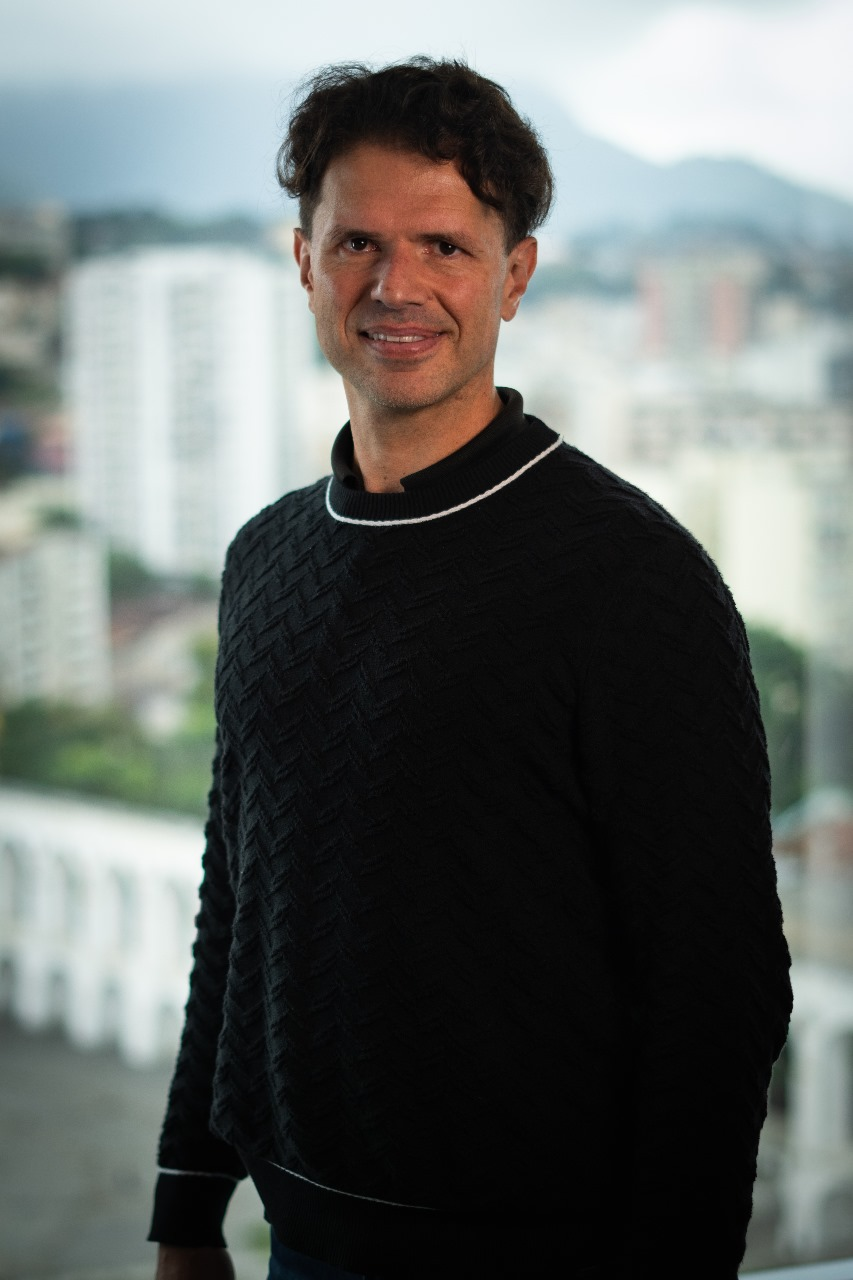
- Born: Marcus Felipe Montenegro Carvalho da Fontoura; Brazil
- Education: Pontifical Catholic University of Rio de Janeiro; University of Waterloo
- Known for: Cloud computing Distributed systems
- Awards: ACM Distinguished Member (2013); Senior Member of the IEEE; IBM Outstanding Technical Achievement Award (2004)
- Scientific career
- Fields: Computer science
- Workplaces: Anthropic; Microsoft; StoneCo; Google; Yahoo! Research; IBM Almaden Research Center; Princeton University
- Doctoral advisor: Carlos José Pereira de Lucena

Marcus Felipe Montenegro Carvalho da Fontoura, known as Marcus Fontoura, is a Brazilian-born American computer scientist and author known for his contributions to cloud computing and large-scale distributed systems. He is ACM Distinguished Member and a senior member of the Institute of Electrical and Electronics Engineers (IEEE). In 2026, he joined Anthropic as a Member of Technical Staff, following two stints at Microsoft (2013–2022 and 2025–2026, roughly a decade combined), most recently serving as Technical Fellow and Chief Technology Officer of Azure Core; in between, he spent three years as Chief Technology Officer of the Brazilian fintech company Stone.

== Education ==
Fontoura earned his Ph.D. in Computer Science from the Pontifical Catholic University of Rio de Janeiro (PUC-Rio) in 1999 through a joint program with the University of Waterloo, Canada. His research focused on object-oriented design and software architecture, culminating in the publication of the book The UML Profile for Framework Architectures (Addison-Wesley, 2001). He also holds an M.Sc. in computer science and a degree in computer engineering, both from PUC-Rio.

== Career ==
Fontoura served as a post-doctoral researcher at Princeton University from 1999 to 2000.

Fontoura was a Research Staff Member at the IBM Almaden Research Center from 2000 to 2005. At IBM, he co-developed a query processor for XPath queries, which became a cornerstone of the XML data type implementation in IBM DB2. He also contributed to the development of IBM OmniFind Enterprise Search, for which he was awarded the IBM Outstanding Technical Achievement Award.

From 2005 to 2010, Fontoura worked at Yahoo! Research as a principal research scientist. He played a key role in developing a large-scale platform for indexing and content serving, which became integral to Yahoo!’s display and textual advertising systems. His contributions to computational advertising and the efficiency of ad-serving systems earned him recognition as a Yahoo! "Superstar" and the recipient of two "You Rock!" awards.

Fontoura was a staff research scientist at Google from 2011 to 2013. At Google, he contributed to the Search Infrastructure team, where he worked on the systems that power Google.com search.

Between 2022 and 2025, Fontoura served as the chief technology officer at Stone, a financial technology company.

Fontoura first joined Microsoft in 2013, initially contributing to Bing’s production infrastructure and Bing Ads projects. He later advanced to become a corporate vice president and Technical Fellow, leading the Azure efficiency team and serving as the chief architect for Azure Compute. His projects include container allocation, power management, and the development of machine learning infrastructure for resource management. He held this role until 2022, before returning to Microsoft in 2025 as Technical Fellow and Chief Technology Officer of Azure Core, focusing on AI for engineering systems, developer productivity, and Azure architecture.

In June 2026, he joined Anthropic as a Member of Technical Staff, working on infrastructure for next-generation AI systems.

== Professional contributions ==
In April 2024, Fontoura delivered a master class on "Engineering Principles and Culture" at the School of Applied Mathematics of the Getulio Vargas Foundation (FGV EMAp) in Rio de Janeiro, sharing insights from his extensive experience in the technology sector.

Fontoura has authored a book titled A Platform Mindset, which provides practical insights into technology management. He also authored Human Agency in a Digital World, a guide to digital literacy and human agency in the AI era.

== Awards and honors ==
- ACM Distinguished Member 2013
- Senior Member of the IEEE
- Elected Yahoo! Superstar and received two You Rock! awards, for contributions to display advertising infrastructure, 2010.
- IBM Outstanding Technical Achievement Award, "for development of a new generation of IBM search technology and its deployment on w3.ibm.com", 2004.
- Post-doctoral Fellowship, Brazilian Science Council, 1999–2000.
- Ph.D. Fellowship, Brazilian Science Council, 1997–1999.
- M.Sc. Fellowship, Brazilian Science Council, 1996–1997.

== Selected list of US patents ==
- 2020 "Searchable Index" US-10853360-B2
- 2020 "Resource Oversubscription Based on Utilization Patterns in Computing Systems" US-10678603-B2
- 2020 "Update Coordination in a Multi-Tenant Cloud Computing Environment" US-10768920-B2
- 2018 "Distributed Operational Control in Computing Systems" US-10153941-B2
- 2014 "Searching Documents for Ranges of Numeric Values" US-8655888-B2

== Invited talks ==
- "Is AI changing how we learn?", TEDxMiami: The Future Is Human, New World Center, Miami Beach, USA, 14 May 2026.
- Keynote talk at 1st Cloud Intelligence Workshop, Toward Intelligent Cloud Platforms and AIOps, 34th AAAI Conference on Artificial Intelligence (AAAI 2020), New York, USA, 2020.
- Guest lecture at Carnegie Mellon University's advanced cloud computing course: Azure's Resource Central, Pittsburgh, USA, 2018.
- Guest lecture at Carnegie Mellon University's advanced cloud computing course: Azure's VM allocator internals, Pittsburgh, USA, 2016.
- Keynote talk at LSDS-IR, Analyzing the performance of top-k retrieval algorithms, The 6th ACM International Conference on Web Search and Data Mining (WSDM 2013), Rome, Italy, 2013.

== Selected publications ==
=== Journal articles ===
- Alissa, Husam; Nick, Teresa; Raniwala, Ashish; Arribas Herranz, Alberto; Frost, Kali; Manousakis, Ioannis; Lio, Kari; Warrier, Brijesh; Oruganti, Vaidehi; et al. (2025-04-30). "Using life cycle assessment to drive innovation for sustainable cool clouds". Nature. 641: 331–338. doi:10.1038/s41586-025-08832-3.
- Bianchini, Ricardo; Fontoura, Marcus; Cortez, Eli; Bonde, Anand; Muzio, Alexandre; Constantin, Ana-Maria; Moscibroda, Thomas; Magalhaes, Gabriel; Bablani, Girish; Russinovich, Mark (2020-01-22). "Toward ML-centric cloud platforms". Communications of the ACM. 63 (2): 50–59. doi:10.1145/3364684. ISSN 0001-0782.
- Gabrilovich, Evgeniy; Broder, Andrei; Fontoura, Marcus; Joshi, Amruta; Josifovski, Vanja; Riedel, Lance; Zhang, Tong (2009). "Classifying search queries using the Web as a source of knowledge". ACM Transactions on the Web. 3 (2): 1–28. doi:10.1145/1513876.1513877. ISSN 1559-1131.
- Fontoura, Marcus; Lempel, Ronny; Qi, Runping; Zien, Jason (2006). "Inverted Index Support for Numeric Search". Internet Mathematics. 3 (2): 153–185. doi:10.1080/15427951.2006.10129119. ISSN 1542-7951.
- Cortés, Mariela; Fontoura, Marcus; Lucena, Carlos (2006). "Framework Evolution Tool". The Journal of Object Technology. 5 (8): 101. doi:10.5381/jot.2006.5.8.a3. ISSN 1660-1769.
- Bar-Yossef, Ziv; Fontoura, Marcus; Josifovski, Vanja (2004-06-14). "On the memory requirements of XPath evaluation over XML streams". Proceedings of the twenty-third ACM SIGMOD-SIGACT-SIGART symposium on Principles of database systems. ACM. pp. 177–188. doi:10.1145/1055558.1055584. ISBN 978-1-58113-858-0.

=== Books ===
- A tecnologia e você: quem controla quem?: Entenda o mundo digital e faça com que ele trabalhe a seu favor (Portuguese translation of Human Agency in a Digital World), Editora Citadel, 2026.
- Human Agency in a Digital World: Understand Technology and Make It Work for You, 8080 Books, 2025.
- A Platform Mindset: Building a Culture of Collaboration, 8080 Books, 2025.
- Tecnologia Intencional: Como Artistas, Bicicletas e Cavalos Transformam Carreiras e Negocios, Marcus Fontoura, Editora Citadel, 2024.
- The UML Profile for Framework Architectures, Marcus Fontoura, Wolfgang Pree, Bernhard Rumpe, Addison-Wesley, 2001.
