= The B-Book =

1996 computer science book

The B-Book: Assigning Programs to Meanings
- Front cover of the 2005 paperback edition
- Author: Jean-Raymond Abrial
- Language: English
- Subject: Computer science Programming languages Applied logic
- Genre: Non-fiction
- Publisher: Cambridge University Press
- Publication date: 1996/2005/2010
- Publication place: United Kingdom
- Media type: Hardback, paperback, ebook
- Pages: xxxiv+779
- ISBN: 0 521 49619 5
- OCLC: 63202590
- Dewey Decimal: 005.1
- LC Class: 2006275990

The B-Book is a book by Jean-Raymond Abrial on the B-Method, a formal method approach to software development, originally developed by him. It was published in 1996 by Cambridge University Press. The book is available in hardback (ISBN 978-0521496193, 1996), paperback (ISBN 978-0521021753, 2005), and ebook form (ISBN 978-0511624162, doi:10.1017/CBO9780511624162, 2010).

The book includes a tribute by C.A.R. Hoare and a foreword by Pierre Chapron of GEC-ALSTHOM Transport. Part I of the book covers Mathematics, Part II Abstract Machines, Part III Programming, and Part IV Refinement. The book also includes six appendices and an index. It was reviewed in The Computer Journal and The Times Higher Education Supplement.

== See also ==
- Abstract machine notation
- Rodin tool
