= Object-Z =

Object-Z is an object-oriented extension to the Z notation developed at the University of Queensland, Australia.

Object-Z extends Z by the addition of language constructs resembling the object-oriented paradigm, most notably, classes. Other object-oriented notions such as polymorphism and inheritance are also supported.

While not as popular as its base language Z, Object-Z has still received significant attention in the formal methods community, and research on aspects of the language are ongoing, including hybrid languages using Object-Z, tool support (e.g., through the Community Z Tools project) and refinement calculi.

== See also ==
- Z++
