= Robert France =

Jamaica-born American computer scientist

- Born: Robert Bertrand France; 8 October 1960; Jamaica
- Died: 15 February 2015 (aged 54); Colorado, United States
- Citizenship: United States
- Education: University of the West Indies (Trinidad and Tobago), Massey University (New Zealand)
- Known for: Formal methods, Unified Modeling Language, model-driven development
- Awards: Dahl–Nygaard Prize (2014)
- Scientific career
- Fields: Computer science
- Workplaces: Florida Atlantic University, Colorado State University

Robert Bertrand France (October 8, 1960 – February 15, 2015) was a Jamaica-born American computer scientist.

Robert B. France was born in Jamaica on October 8, 1960, the eldest son of Robert W. and Jeanette France. He attended high school in Guyana and studied for a BSc degree in Natural Sciences at the University of the West Indies in Saint Augustine, Trinidad and Tobago, majoring in Computer Science and Mathematics and receiving a first class degree in 1984. He then attended Massey University in New Zealand funded by a Commonwealth Scholarship, where he achieved a PhD degree in computer science in 1990. During the same year, he married Sheriffa R. Soleyn in Saint Vincent. They emigrated to the United States together and in due course moved to Fort Collins, Colorado.

During 1990–92, France was a postdoctoral research associate at the Institute for Advanced Computer Studies, University of Maryland. From 1992 to 1997, he was an assistant professor in the computer science and engineering department at Florida Atlantic University (FAU), becoming tenured in 1997–98. France was then appointed an associate professor from 1998 until 2004 and then full professor at Colorado State University within the department of computer science. He undertook research on model-driven software development, especially concerning formal software modeling languages and associated analysis tools. He was co-founder and editor-in-chief of the Software and Systems Modeling journal from 1999 until 2015.

In 2008, Robert France and his co-authors Andy Evans, Kevin Lano, and Bernhard Rumpe, were awarded the Ten Year Most Influential Paper Award at the MODELS 2008 Conference on Model Driven Engineering Languages and Systems for the 1998 paper "The UML as a Formal Modeling Notation". In 2013, France was awarded a five-year International Chair at INRIA in France. He was awarded a senior Dahl–Nygaard Prize for his research by the Association Internationale pour les Technologies Objets (AITO) in 2014. In the same year, he was awarded a Colorado State University, College of Natural Sciences Professor Laureate and an Excellence in Science and Technology Award from the Institute of Caribbean Studies.

Robert France died on February 15, 2015. He had a son and daughter with his wife, Sheriffa.

== Selected publications ==
- Evans, A.; France, R.; Lano, K.; Rumpe, B. (1998). "The UML as a Formal Modeling Notation". The Unified Modeling Language. «UML»'98: Beyond the Notation. Lecture Notes in Computer Science. Vol. 1618. Springer-Verlag. pp. 336–348. arXiv:1409.6919. doi:10.1007/978-3-540-48480-6_26. ISBN 978-3-540-66252-5. S2CID 32729.
- France, R.B.; Kim, D.K.; Ghosh, S.; Song, E. (March 2004). "A UML-based pattern specification technique". IEEE Transactions on Software Engineering. 30 (3): 193–206. Bibcode:2004ITSEn..30..193F. doi:10.1109/TSE.2004.1271174. S2CID 401141.
- France, R.; Rumpe, B. (23–25 May 2007). "Model-driven Development of Complex Software: A Research Roadmap". Future of Software Engineering (FOSE '07). IEEE. pp. 37–54. arXiv:1409.6620. doi:10.1109/FOSE.2007.14. ISBN 978-0-7695-2829-8. S2CID 14920149.
- Blair, G.; Bencomo, N.; France, R.B. (October 2009). "Models@ run.time". Computer. 42 (10). IEEE: 22–27. Bibcode:2009Compr..42j..22B. doi:10.1109/MC.2009.326. S2CID 17647617.
- Turk, D.; France, R.; Rumpe, B. (2014). "Limitations of agile software processes". arXiv:1409.6600 [cs.SE].
