= Termination analysis =

Determination of whether a given program halts for each input

def f(n):
   while n > 1:
      if n % 2 == 0:
          n = n / 2
      else:
          n = 3 * n + 1

As of 2026, it is still unknown
whether this Python program
terminates for every integer input;
see Collatz conjecture.

In computer science, termination analysis is program analysis which attempts to determine whether the evaluation of a given program halts for each input. This means to determine whether the input program computes a total function.

It is closely related to the halting problem, which is to determine whether a given program halts for a given input and which is undecidable. The termination analysis is even more difficult than the halting problem: the termination analysis in the model of Turing machines as the model of programs implementing computable functions would have the goal of deciding whether a given Turing machine is a total Turing machine, and this problem is at level $\Pi^0_2$ of the arithmetical hierarchy and thus is strictly more difficult than the halting problem.

Now as the question of whether a computable function is total is not semi-decidable, each sound termination analyzer (i.e. an affirmative answer is never given for a non-terminating program) is incomplete, i.e. must fail in determining termination for infinitely many terminating programs, either by running forever or halting with an indefinite answer.

== Termination proof ==
A termination proof is a type of mathematical proof that plays a critical role in formal verification because total correctness of an algorithm depends on termination.

A simple, general method for constructing termination proofs involves associating a measure with each step of an algorithm. The measure is taken from the domain of a well-founded relation, such as from the ordinal numbers. If the measure "decreases" according to the relation along every possible step of the algorithm, it must terminate, because there are no infinite descending chains with respect to a well-founded relation. Such functions which assign measures to steps of an algorithm are called ranking functions.

Some types of termination analysis can automatically generate or imply the existence of a termination proof.

== Example ==
An example of a programming language construct which may or may not terminate is a loop, as they can be run repeatedly. Loops implemented using a counter variable as typically found in data processing algorithms will usually terminate, demonstrated by the pseudocode example below:

i := 0
loop until i = SIZE_OF_DATA
    process_data(data[i])) // process the data chunk at position i
    i := i + 1 // move to the next chunk of data to be processed

If the value of SIZE_OF_DATA is non-negative, fixed and finite, the loop will eventually terminate, assuming process_data terminates too.

Some loops can be shown to always terminate or never terminate through human inspection. For example, the following loop will, in theory, never stop. However, it may halt when executed on a physical machine due to arithmetic overflow: either leading to an exception or causing the counter to wrap to a negative value and enabling the loop condition to be fulfilled.

i := 1
loop until i = 0
    i := i + 1

In termination analysis one may also try to determine the termination behaviour of some program depending on some unknown input. The following example illustrates this problem.

i := 1
loop until i = UNKNOWN
    i := i + 1

Here the loop condition is defined using some value UNKNOWN, where the value of UNKNOWN is not known (e.g. defined by the user's input when the program is executed). Here the termination analysis must take into account all possible values of UNKNOWN and find out that in the possible case of UNKNOWN = 0 (as in the original example) the termination cannot be shown.

There is, however, no general procedure for determining whether an expression involving looping instructions will halt, even when humans are tasked with the inspection. The theoretical reason for this is the undecidability of the halting problem: there cannot exist some algorithm which determines whether any given program stops after finitely many computation steps.

In practice one fails to show termination (or non-termination) because every algorithm works with a finite set of methods being able to extract relevant information out of a given program. A method might look at how variables change with respect to some loop condition (possibly showing termination for that loop), other methods might try to transform the program's calculation to some mathematical construct and work on that, possibly getting information about the termination behaviour out of some properties of this mathematical model. But because each method is only able to "see" some specific reasons for (non)termination, even through combination of such methods one cannot cover all possible reasons for (non)termination.

Recursive functions and loops are equivalent in expression; any expression involving loops can be written using recursion, and vice versa. Thus the termination of recursive expressions is also undecidable in general. Most recursive expressions found in common usage (i.e. not pathological) can be shown to terminate through various means, usually depending on the definition of the expression itself. As an example, the function argument in the recursive expression for the factorial function below will always decrease by 1; by the well-ordering property of natural numbers, the argument will eventually reach 1 and the recursion will terminate.

function factorial (argument as natural number)
    if argument = 0 or argument = 1
        return 1
    otherwise
        return argument * factorial(argument - 1)

== Dependent types ==
Termination checking is very important in dependently typed programming language and theorem proving systems like Rocq and Agda. These systems use Curry-Howard isomorphism between programs and proofs. Proofs over inductively defined data types were traditionally described using induction principles. However, it was found later that describing a program via a recursively defined function with pattern matching is a more natural way of proving than using induction principles directly. Unfortunately, allowing non-terminating definitions leads to logical inconsistency in type theories, which is why Agda and Rocq have termination checkers built-in.

=== Sized types ===
One of the approaches to termination checking in dependently typed programming languages are sized types. The main idea is to annotate the types over which we can recurse with size annotations and allow recursive calls only on smaller arguments, such that there is a natural ranking function from some function's state to its argument's size. Sized types are implemented in Agda as a syntactic extension.

== Probabilistic programs ==
Saying that specific probabilistic program always terminate can be considered as too strong of a definition. Take, for example, a biased random walk, with ~ representing sampling from a probability distribution, and uniform(a, b) a uniform probability distribution from $a$ to $b$:

x = 0
loop until 10 < x
    amount ~ uniform(-1, 2)
    x = x + amount

While this loop would not terminate if the uniform probability distribution was treated as demonic non-determinism, since the expected value of the sampled distribution is $0.5$, it is intuitive to believe that this loop eventually terminates, and furthermore, it eventually terminates after a certain number of loop iterations. This notion is referred to as positive almost sure termination. Replacing uniform(-1, 2) with uniform(-1, 1) also leads to almost sure termination, since while an unbiased random walk does eventually terminate, there is no nice bound to the number of loop iterations it will take.

Despite these differences, probabilistic program termination analysis can also be done using a similar aforementioned ranking function method, via supermartingale ranking functions. Effectively, these "SMRFs" are non-negative at non-final states of a program, and decrease their value for each program transition by some lower bound with respect to the probability of the expected value of the SMRF for each transition. In 2024, Rupak Majumdar and Sathiyanarayana Venkatesan Ramesh made a probabilistic termination analysis proof rule was found that was both sound and relatively complete using a pair of a ranking function and a variant function based on an overarching loop invariant, and used the resulting techniques to show that Annabelle McIver et al.'s proof rule for termination developed in 2018 was also relatively complete.

== Current research ==
There are several research teams that work on new methods that can show (non)termination. Many researchers include these methods into programs that try to analyze the termination behavior automatically (so without human interaction). An ongoing aspect of research is to allow the existing methods to be used to analyze termination behavior of programs written in "real world" programming languages. For declarative languages like Haskell, Mercury and Prolog, many results exist (mainly because of the strong mathematical background of these languages). The research community also works on new methods to analyze termination behavior of programs written in imperative languages like C and Java.

== See also ==
- Complexity analysis — the problem of estimating the time needed to terminate
- Loop variant
- Total functional programming — a programming paradigm that restricts the range of programs to those that are provably terminating
- Walther recursion
- Size-change termination principle
