= Size-change termination principle =

The size-change termination principle (SCT) guarantees termination for a computer program by proving that infinite computations always trigger infinite descent in data values that are well-founded. Size-change termination analysis utilizes this principle in order to solve the universal halting problem for a certain class of programs. When applied to general programs, the principle is intended to be used conservatively, which means that if the analysis determines that a program is terminating, the answer is sound, but a negative answer means "don't know". The decision problem for SCT is PSPACE-complete; however, there exists an algorithm that computes an approximation of the decision problem in polynomial time. Size-change analysis is applicable to both first-order and higher-order functional programs, as well as imperative programs and logic programs. The latter application preceded by four years the general formulation of the principle by Lee et al.

== Overview ==
The size-change termination principle was introduced by Chin Soon Lee, Neil D. Jones, and Amir M. Ben-Amram in 2001. It relies on intermediary objects called size-change graphs that describe the relationship between source and destination parameters in a given function call (for a functional program). The method analyzes these graphs to make conclusions about the existence of monotonically decreasing sequences of parameters throughout the execution of a program. The size-change termination principle is stated as such:

If every infinite computation would give rise to an infinitely decreasing value sequence (according to the size-change graphs), then no infinite computation is possible.

Size-change graphs express both the possible presence of a function call as well as whether parameters within function call decrease or do not increase. In order to derive termination from size-change graphs, Lee at al. formulate a sufficient condition in terms of the graphs (with no reference to the underlying program). This condition is decidable by an algorithm that operates solely on the graphs.

Size-change termination analysis is related to abstract interpretation, in particular to a technique called predicate abstraction.

== Relationship to the halting problem ==
The halting problem for Turing-complete computational models states that the decision problem of whether a program will halt on a particular input, or on all inputs, is undecidable. Therefore, a general algorithm for proving any program to halt does not exist. Size-change termination is decidable because it only asks whether termination is provable from given size-change graphs.
