= Software and Systems Modeling =

- Discipline: Computer science
- Language: English
- Edited by: Marsha Chechik, Benoit Combemale, Bernhard Rumpe

Publication details
- History: 2002–present
- Publisher: Springer-Verlag
- Frequency: 6 issues per year
- Open access: Hybrid. Open Access options available
- Impact factor: 3.0 (2025)

Standard abbreviations
- ISO 4: Softw. Syst. Model.

Indexing
- ISSN: 1619-1366 (print); 1619-1374 (web)

Links
- Journal homepage; Publisher information

Software and Systems Modeling (SoSyM) is a peer-reviewed scientific journal covering the development and application of software and systems modeling languages and techniques, including modeling foundations, semantics, analysis and synthesis techniques, model transformations, language definition and language engineering issues. It was established in 2002 and is published by Springer Science+Business Media. The editors-in-chief are Marsha Chechik (University of Toronto), Benoit Combemale (University of Rennes), and Bernhard Rumpe (RWTH Aachen University). They are supported by the associate editor Jean-Marc Jezequel (IRISA/INRIA and University of Rennes) and the assistant editors Stéphanie Challita (University of Rennes), Sophia Jit (University of Toronto), and Martin Schindler (RWTH Aachen University). The members of the editorial board can be found on https://www.sosym.org/.

Robert France was co-founder and editor-in-chief of the journal from 1999 until 2015.

According to the Journal Citation Reports, the journal has a 2024 impact factor of 3.2.

The journal is widely abstracted and indexed, for example in ACM Digital Library, DBLP, EBSCO, INSPEC, ProQuest, and SCOPUS.
