= Wolfgang Pree =

Austrian computer scientist

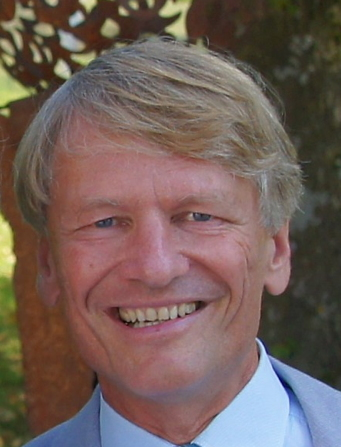
- Wolfgang Pree
- Born: 27 June 1964 (age 62); Linz, Austria
- Education: Johannes Kepler University Linz, Austria
- Known for: framework design patterns, embedded programming languages and tools, autonomous train driving
- Scientific career
- Fields: Computer science
- Workplaces: University of Salzburg
- Doctoral advisor: Gustav Pomberger (computer scientist)

Wolfgang Pree (born 27 June 1964 in Linz, Austria) is a computer scientist and professor at the University of Salzburg, Austria.

== Education and academic work ==
Pree is a Full Professor of Computer Science at the University of Salzburg, Austria since 2002. He studied computer science at the Johannes Kepler University of Linz, was a Visiting Assistant Professor at Washington University in St. Louis (1992–93), a guest scientist at Siemens Munich (1994–95), a Full Professor of Computer Science (C4) at the University of Konstanz, Germany (1996–2001), and spent sabbaticals at the University of California, Berkeley and the University of California, San Diego.

His field of research is software engineering, especially software construction principles, and machine learning. His C. Doppler Laboratory Embedded Software Systems (2007–2014) in cooperation with AVL List focused on real-time software in automobiles and automation systems. The research results are further developed into products by Chrona and are deployed in Daimler's next generation of electric vehicles since 2019/20.

Pioneering work has been done in the field of autonomously driving trains on open tracks since 2008: the Austrian Klima- und Energie-Fonds supported the autoBAHN project, so that a pilot system could be implemented on the Stern&Hafferl line between Vorchdorf and Gmunden in 2008–2013.

Pree initiated Go4IT in 2017 (start of a bachelor's degree in computer science at high school): high school students can attend introductory courses in computer science at the University of Salzburg from 9th grade onwards.
