= Susanne Biundo-Stephan =

German computer scientist

Susanne Biundo-Stephan (born 1955) is a retired German computer scientist, and a professor of computer science at the University of Ulm. Her research concerns automated planning and scheduling in artificial intelligence.

== Education and career ==
Biundo earned a doctorate (Dr. rer. nat.) in 1989, from the Karlsruhe Institute of Technology. Her dissertation, Automatische Synthese rekursiver Programme als Beweisverfahren, was published in 1992 as a book by Springer.

She was a researcher at the German Research Centre for Artificial Intelligence from 1989 to 1998, before taking her present position as a professor at the University of Ulm in 1998. She headed the artificial intelligence institute at Ulm from 2017 until her retirement in 2021.

== Recognition ==
Biundo is a fellow of the European Association for Artificial Intelligence (formerly the European Co-ordinating Committee for Artificial Intelligence, ECCAI), elected in 2004.
