= Annabelle McIver =

Computer security researcher

Annabelle K. McIver is a computer scientist whose research involves the use of formal methods and information flow in computer security and the verification of probabilistic systems. Educated in mathematics in the UK, she works in Australia as professor in the School of Computing at Macquarie University, and as one of the founding leaders of Macquarie's Future Communications Research Centre.

== Education ==
McIver read mathematics at the University of Cambridge, where she was awarded a double first in 1985. She completed a doctorate (D.Phil.) at the University of Oxford in 1990. Her dissertation, Non-Hopf modules for infinite soluble groups, concerned abstract algebra, and was jointly supervised by Peter M. Neumann and Martin B. Powell.

== Books ==
McIver is a co-author of The Science of Quantitative Information Flow (Springer, 2020, with M. S. Alvim, C. Palamidessi, K. Chatzikokolakis, C. Morgan, and G. Smith), and of Abstraction, Refinement and Proof for Probabilistic Systems (Springer, 2005, with C. Morgan).
