= Logic for Programming, Artificial Intelligence and Reasoning =

The International Conference on Logic for Programming, Artificial Intelligence and Reasoning (LPAR) is an academic conference aiming at discussing cutting-edge results in the fields of automated reasoning, computational logic, programming languages and their applications.

It grew out of the Russian Conferences on Logic Programming 1990 and 1991; the idea to organize the conference was largely due to Robert Kowalski who proposed to create the Russian Association for Logic Programming. The conference was renamed in 1992 to "Logic Programming and Automated Reasoning" (LPAR) to reflect its extended scope, due to considerable interest in automated reasoning in the Former Soviet Union. After a break from 1995 to 1998, LPAR continued in 1999 under the name "Logic for Programming and Automated Reasoning", to indicate an extension of its logic part beyond logic programming. In 2001, the name changed to "Logic for Programming, Artificial Intelligence and Reasoning".

The LPAR steering committee consists of Matthias Baaz, Chris Fermüller, Geoff Sutcliffe, and Andrei Voronkov (chair).

Following its slogan "To boldly go where no reasonable conference has gone before", LPAR typically takes place in locations that are unusual or difficult to reach.

== Overview of conference events ==
Date			No.	Name	Acr.	Location	LNCS	ISBN
Sep	14-18	1990	1st	Russian Conference on Logic Programming	RCLP	Irkutsk, Russia	592	3-540-55460-2
Sep	11-16	1991	2nd	Russian Conference on Logic Programming	RCLP	St.Petersburg, Russia, on board the ship "Michail Lomonosov"	592	3-540-55460-2
Jul	15-20	1992	3rd	International Conference on Logic Programming and Automated Reasoning	LPAR	St.Petersburg, Russia, on board the ship "Michail Lomonosov"	624	3-540-55727-X
Jul	13-20	1993	4th	International Conference on Logic Programming and Automated Reasoning	LPAR	St.Petersburg, Russia	698	3-540-56944-8
Jul	16-22	1994	5th	International Conference on Logic Programming and Automated Reasoning	LPAR	Kiev, Ukraine, on board the ship "Marshal Koshevoi"	822	3-540-58216-9
Sep	06-10	1999	6th	International Conference on Logic for Programming and Automated Reasoning	LPAR	Tbilisi, Georgia	1705	3-540-66492-0
Nov	11-12	2000	7th	International Conference on Logic for Programming and Automated Reasoning	LPAR	Reunion Island, France	1955	3-540-41285-9
Dec	03-07	2001	8th	International Conference on Logic for Programming, Artificial Intelligence, and Reasoning	LPAR	Havana, Cuba	2250	3-540-42957-3
Oct	14-18	2002	9th	International Conference on Logic for Programming, Artificial Intelligence, and Reasoning	LPAR	Tbilisi, Georgia	2514	3-540-00010-0
Sep	22-26	2003	10th	International Conference on Logic for Programming, Artificial Intelligence, and Reasoning	LPAR	Almaty, Kazakhstan	2850	3-540-20101-7
Mar	14-18	2005	11th	International Conference on Logic for Programming, Artificial Intelligence, and Reasoning	LPAR	Montevideo, Uruguay	3452	3-540-25236-3
Dec	02-06	2005	12th	International Conference on Logic for Programming, Artificial Intelligence, and Reasoning	LPAR	Montego Bay, Jamaica	3835	3-540-30553-X
Nov	13-17	2006	13th	International Conference on Logic for Programming, Artificial Intelligence, and Reasoning	LPAR	Phnom Penh, Cambodia	4246	3-540-48281-4
Oct	15-19	2007	14th	International Conference on Logic for Programming, Artificial Intelligence, and Reasoning	LPAR	Yerevan, Armenia	4790	978-3-540-75560-9
Nov	22-27	2008	15th	International Conference on Logic for Programming, Artificial Intelligence, and Reasoning	LPAR	Doha, Qatar	5330	978-3-540-89438-4
Apr	25-30	2010	16th	International Conference on Logic for Programming, Artificial Intelligence, and Reasoning	LPAR	Dakar, Senegal	6355	978-3-642-17510-7
Oct	10-15	2010	17th	International Conference on Logic for Programming, Artificial Intelligence, and Reasoning	LPAR	Yogyakarta, Indonesia	6397	978-3-642-16241-1
Mar	10-15	2012	18th	International Conference on Logic for Programming, Artificial Intelligence, and Reasoning	LPAR	Mérida, Venezuela	7180	978-3-642-28716-9
Dec	10-15	2013	19th	International Conference on Logic for Programming, Artificial Intelligence, and Reasoning	LPAR	Stellenbosch, South Africa	8312	978-3-642-45220-8
Nov	24-28	2015	20th	International Conference on Logic for Programming, Artificial Intelligence, and Reasoning	LPAR	Suva, Fiji	9450	978-3-662-48899-7
May	7-12	2017	21st	International Conference on Logic for Programming, Artificial Intelligence, and Reasoning	LPAR	Maun, Botswana	-	ISSN 2398-7340
Nov	16-21	2018	22nd	International Conference on Logic for Programming, Artificial Intelligence, and Reasoning	LPAR	Awassa, Ethiopia	-	ISSN 2398-7340
Jan	12-13	2021	23rd	International Conference on Logic for Programming, Artificial Intelligence, and Reasoning	LPAR	Online due to COVID	-	ISSN 2398-7340
Jun	4-9	2023	24th	International Conference on Logic for Programming, Artificial Intelligence, and Reasoning	LPAR	Manizales, Colombia	-	ISSN 2398-7340
May	26-31	2024	25th	International Conference on Logic for Programming, Artificial Intelligence, and Reasoning	LPAR	Mauritius	-	ISSN 2398-7340
