= Bernhard Rumpe =

German computer scientist

Bernhard Rumpe (born 1967) is a German computer scientist, professor of computer science and head of the Software Engineering Department at the RWTH Aachen University. His research focuses on "technologies, methods, tools ... necessary to create software in the necessary quality that is as efficient and sustainable as possible."

== Biography ==
Born and raised in Abensberg, Germany, Rumpe from 1973 to 1977 attended the Aventinus Primary School Abensberg and from 1977 to 1986 the Donau Gymnasium Kelheim. From 1987 to 1992 he studied computer science and mathematics at the Technical University of Munich (TUM). In 1992 he became research assistant at the Chair for Software and Systems Engineering at the Technical University of Munich, were in 1996 he received his PhD and in 2003 his habilitation in computer science.

From 2003 to 2008 Rumpe headed the Institute for Software Systems Engineering at the Braunschweig University of Technology (TUBS). Here in 2007 he headed the participation of the university in the DARPA Urban Challenge. Since early 2009 he is Head of the Department Software Engineering at RWTH Aachen University In 2001 he founded the Springer International Journal Software and Systems Modeling, together with his colleague Robert France and works there as an editor-in-chief.

Rumpe contributed to the semantics and the use of modeling languages in software development (requirements, architecture, code generation, system configuration, quality management) based on the work started by his group Language Workbench MontiCore.

== Selected publications ==
- 1996. Formale Methodik des Entwurfs verteilter objektorientierter Systeme, München: Utz, Wiss. ISBN 9783896751492
- 2000. Software Engineering: Schlüssel zu Prozessbeherrschung und Informationsmanagement , TCW, ISBN 9783931511524
- 2001. Übungen zur Einführung in die Informatik., Manfred Broy, Bernhard Rumpe. Springer, ISBN 9783540635499
- 2001. The UML Profile for Framework Architectures, Marcus Fontoura, Wolfgang Pree, Bernhard Rumpe. Addison-Wesley.
- 2004. Modellierung mit UML, Berlin: Springer, ISBN 9783540209041
- 2004. Agile Modellierung mit UML, Berlin: Springer Berlin, ISBN 9783540209058
- 2011. Modellierung mit UML, 2nd edition, Berlin: Springer, ISBN 9783642224126
- 2012. Agile Modellierung mit UML: Codegenerierung, Testfälle, Refactoring, 2nd edition, Berlin: Springer Berlin, ISBN 9783642224294
- 2014. Architecture and Behavior Modeling of Cyber-Physical Systems with MontiArcAutomaton, J. O. Ringert, B. Rumpe, A. Wortmann. Aachener Informatik-Berichte, Software Engineering Band 20. Shaker Verlag, ISBN 9783844031201
- 2016. Modeling with UML: Language, Concepts, Methods. Springer International.
- 2016: Engineering Modeling Languages: Turning Domain Knowledge into Tools., B. Combemale, R. France, J. Jézéquel, B. Rumpe, J. Steel, D. Vojtisek. Chapman & Hall/CRC Innovations in Software Engineering and Software Development Series.
- 2017. Agile Modeling with UML: Code Generation, Testing, Refactoring, Springer International.
- 2017. Towards a Sustainable Artifact Model, T. Greifenberg, S. Hillemacher, B. Rumpe. Aachener Informatik-Berichte, Software Engineering Band 30. Shaker Verlag, ISBN 9783844056785
- 2020. Towards an Isabelle Theory for distributed, interactive systems - the untimed case, J. C. Bürger, H. Kausch, D. Raco, J. O. Ringert, B. Rumpe, S. Stüber, M. Wiartalla. Shaker Verlag, ISBN 9783844072655
- 2021. Model-Based Engineering of Collaborative Embedded Systems, W. Böhm, M. Broy, C. Klein, K. Pohl, B. Rumpe, S. Schröck (Eds.). Springer, ISBN 9783030621353
- 2021: MontiCore Language Workbench and Library Handbook: Edition 2021, K. Hölldobler, O. Kautz, B. Rumpe. Aachener Informatik-Berichte, Software Engineering Band 48. Shaker Verlag, ISBN 9783844080100
