= Z notation =

Formal specification language used for describing and modelling computing systems

An example of a formal specification (in Spanish) using the Z notation, with named schema boxes, including declarations and predicates

The Z notation /ˈzɛd/ is a formal specification language used for describing and modelling computing systems. It is targeted at the clear specification of computer programs and computer-based systems in general.

== History ==
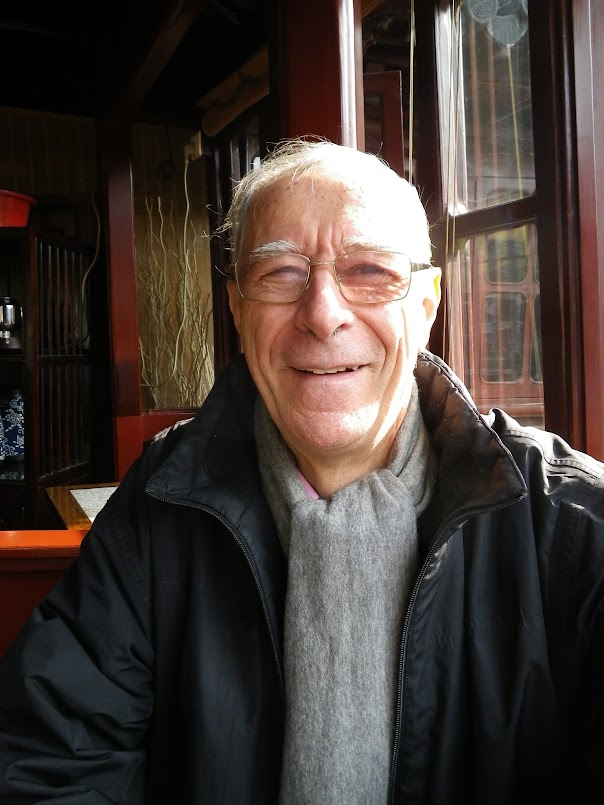
Jean-Raymond Abrial, the main originator of the Z notation

In 1974, Jean-Raymond Abrial published "Data Semantics". He used a notation that would later be taught in the University of Grenoble until the end of the 1980s.

While at EDF (Électricité de France), working with Bertrand Meyer, Abrial also worked on developing Z. Z was originally proposed by Abrial in 1977 with the help of Steve Schuman and Bertrand Meyer. The Z notation is used in the 1980 book Méthodes de programmation.

Z was developed further at the Programming Research Group at Oxford University, where Abrial worked in the early 1980s with researchers including Bernard Sufrin and Ib Holm Sørensen (1949–2012), having arrived at Oxford in September 1979. Sørensen received a DPhil degree from Oxford University in 1981 on early Z-based research. He taught early courses in Z notation at Oxford and established the Z User Meeting series, initially in Oxford.

Ib Holm Sørensen led the Transaction Processing Project at Oxford University from its inception in 1982 (later renamed the "CICS Project",), in collaboration with IBM Hursley. The project formally specified parts of IBM's CICS transaction processing software using Z notation. This won a Queen's Award for Technological Achievement in 1992. As part of the CICS project, Sørensen extended Edsger Dijkstra's Guarded Command Language by allowing the use of Z-schema notation as abstract commands. These ideas were later formalized by Carroll Morgan in his refinement calculus.

Z schema boxes were added by Carroll Morgan for the structuring of larger specifications. Ian Hayes edited the 1987 book Specification Case Study on the use of Z (2nd edition published in 1993), with contributions from Morgan, Sørensen, Sufrin, and others. A de facto standard for Z was produced as a book by Mike Spivey in 1989 (2nd edition, 1992).

Abrial has said that Z is so named "Because it is the ultimate language!" although the name "Zermelo" is also associated with the Z notation through its use of Zermelo–Fraenkel set theory.

== Usage and notation ==
Z is based on the standard mathematical notation used in axiomatic set theory, lambda calculus, and first-order predicate logic. All expressions in Z notation are typed, thereby avoiding some of the paradoxes of naive set theory. Z contains a standardized catalogue (called the mathematical toolkit) of commonly used mathematical functions and predicates, defined using Z itself. It is augmented with Z schema boxes, which can be combined using their own operators, based on standard logical operators, and also by including schemas within other schemas. This allows Z specifications to be built up into large specifications in a convenient manner.

== Z User Group ==
In 1985, a series of Z Users Meetings was instigated by Ib Sørensen, initially at Rewley House in Oxford. In 1992, the Z User Group (ZUG) was established at one of these meetings to oversee activities concerning the Z notation, especially meetings and conferences. ZUG continued to organize regular Z User Workshops/Meetings (ZUM). Later, when they began to be held outside the United Kingdom, these became known as the International Conference of Z Users. Later still, these conferences were combined to cover the B-Method as well, becoming known as the International Conference of B and Z Users (ZB).

== Standards ==
ISO completed a Z standardization effort in 2002. This standard and a technical corrigendum are available from ISO free:

- the standard is publicly available freely from ISO ITTF and, separately, available for purchase from the ISO site;
- the technical corrigendum is available freely from ISO.

Because Z notation uses many non-ASCII symbols, the specification includes suggestions for rendering the Z notation symbols in ASCII and in LaTeX. There are also Unicode encodings for all standard Z symbols.

== Award ==
In 1992, Oxford University Computing Laboratory and IBM were jointly awarded The Queen's Award for Technological Achievement "for the development of ... the Z notation, and its application in the IBM Customer Information Control System (CICS) product."

== See also ==
- Z User Group (ZUG)
- Community Z Tools (CZT) project
- Other formal methods (and languages using formal specifications):
  - VDM-SL, the main alternative to Z
  - B-Method, developed by Jean-Raymond Abrial (creator of Z notation)
  - Z++ and Object-Z, object extensions for the Z notation
  - Alloy, a specification language inspired by Z notation and implementing the principles of Object Constraint Language (OCL)
- Fastest, a model-based testing tool for the Z notation
- Unified Modeling Language, a software system design modeling tool by Object Management Group
