= Community Z Tools =

The Community Z Tools (CZT) initiative is based around a SourceForge project to build a set of tools for the Z notation, a formal method useful in software engineering. Tools include support for editing, typechecking and animating Z specifications. There is some support for extensions such as Object-Z and TCOZ. The tools are built using the Java programming language.

CZT was proposed by Andrew Martin of Oxford University in 2001.
