= Jean-Raymond Abrial =

French computer scientist (1938–2025)

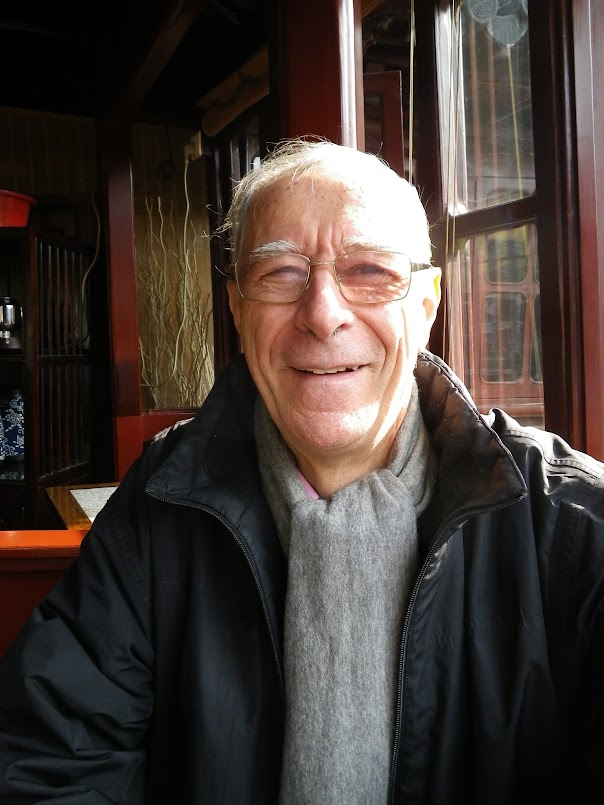
- J.-R. Abrial in 2012
- Born: 6 November 1938; Versailles, France
- Died: 26 May 2025 (aged 86); Marseille, France
- Education: École Polytechnique; Stanford University
- Known for: Z notation, B-Method, Event-B
- Awards: Member of the Academia Europaea (2006)
- Scientific career
- Fields: Computer science, software engineering, formal methods
- Institutions: Oxford University Computing Laboratory, ETH Zurich
- Patrons: Tony Hoare

Jean-Raymond Abrial (6 November 1938 – 26 May 2025) was a French computer scientist and originator of the Z and B formal methods.

== Life and career ==
Abrial was born on 6 November 1938. He was a student at the École Polytechnique (class of 1958). He also attended Master's courses at Stanford University during 1963–65.

Abrial's 1974 paper Data Semantics laid the foundation for a formal approach to Data Models; although not adopted directly by practitioners, it directly influenced all subsequent models from the Entity-Relationship Model through to RDF.

J.-R. Abrial is the father of the Z notation (typically used for formal specification of software), during his time at the Programming Research Group under Prof. Tony Hoare within the Oxford University Computing Laboratory (now Oxford University Department of Computer Science), arriving in 1979 and sharing an office and collaborating with Cliff Jones. He later initiated the B-Method, with better tool-based software development support for refinement from a high-level specification to an executable program, including the Rodin tool. These are two important formal methods approaches for software engineering. He is the author of The B-Book: Assigning Programs to Meanings. For much of his career he was an independent consultant. He was an invited professor at ETH Zurich from 2004 to 2009. He developed the B approach further as Event-B.

Abrial was elected to be a Member of the Academia Europaea in 2006. As well as being a computer scientist, he was also an explorer in north Africa and elsewhere.

== Death ==
He died on 26 May 2025, at the age of 86.

== See also ==
- The B-Book
- B-Method
- Event-B
- Rodin tool
- Z notation
