= Ralph-Johan Back =

Finnish computer scientist

- Education: University of Helsinki
- Occupation: Computer scientist

Ralph-Johan Back is a Finnish computer scientist. Back originated the refinement calculus, an important approach to the formal development of programs using stepwise refinement, in his 1978 PhD thesis at the University of Helsinki, On the Correctness of Refinement Steps in Program Development. He has undertaken much subsequent research in this area. He has held positions at CWI Amsterdam, the Academy of Finland and the University of Tampere.

Since 1983, he has been Professor of Computer Science at the Åbo Akademi University in Turku. For 2002–2007, he was an Academy Professor at the Academy of Finland. He is Director of CREST (Center for Reliable Software Technology) at Åbo Akademi.

Back is a member of Academia Europaea.
