= E-graph =

Graph data structure

In computer science, an e-graph is a data structure that stores equivalence relations over terms of some language. E-graphs are widely used in automated theorem provers, program optimizers, and other program analysis problems.

== Definition and operations ==
Let $\Sigma$ be a set of uninterpreted functions, where $\Sigma_n$ is the subset of $\Sigma$ consisting of functions of arity $n$. Let $\mathbb{id}$ be a countable set of opaque identifiers that may be compared for equality, called e-class IDs. The application of $f\in\Sigma_n$ to e-class IDs $i_1, i_2, \ldots, i_n\in\mathbb{id}$ is denoted $f(i_1, i_2, \ldots, i_n)$ and called an e-node.

The e-graph then represents equivalence classes of e-nodes, using the following data structures:

- A union-find structure $U$ representing equivalence classes of e-class IDs, with the usual operations $\mathrm{find}$, $\mathrm{add}$ and $\mathrm{merge}$. An e-class ID $e$ is canonical if $\mathrm{find}(U, e) = e$; an e-node $f(i_1,\ldots,i_n)$ is canonical if each $i_j$ is canonical ($j$ in $1,\ldots,n$).
- An association of e-class IDs with sets of e-nodes, called e-classes. This consists of
  - a hashcons $H$ (i.e. a mapping) from e-nodes to e-class IDs, and
  - an e-class map $M$ that maps e-class IDs to e-classes, such that $M$ maps equivalent IDs to the same set of e-nodes: $\forall i, j\in\mathbb{id},M[i]=M[j]\Leftrightarrow \mathrm{find}(U,i)=\mathrm{find}(U,j)$

=== Invariants ===
In addition to the above structure, a valid e-graph conforms to several data structure invariants. Two e-nodes are equivalent if they are in the same e-class. The congruence invariant states that an e-graph must ensure that equivalence is closed under congruence, where two e-nodes $f(i_1,\ldots,i_n),f(j_1,\ldots,j_n)$ are congruent when $\mathrm{find}(U, i_k)=\mathrm{find}(U, j_k),k\in \{1,\ldots,n\}$. The hashcons invariant states that the hashcons maps canonical e-nodes to their e-class ID.

=== Operations ===
E-graphs expose wrappers around the $\mathrm{add}$, $\mathrm{find}$, and $\mathrm{merge}$ operations from the union-find that preserve the e-graph invariants. The last operation, e-matching, is described below.

=== Equivalent formulations ===
An e-graph can also be formulated as a bipartite graph $G=(N\uplus\mathrm{id},E)$ where

- $\mathrm{id}$ is the set of e-class IDs (as above),
- $N$ is the set of e-nodes, and
- $E\subseteq (\mathrm{id}\times N)\cup (N\times \mathrm{id})$ is a set of directed edges.

There is a directed edge from each e-class to each of its members, and from each e-node to each of its children.

== E-matching ==
Let $V$ be a set of variables and let $\mathrm{Term}(\Sigma, V)$ be the smallest set that includes the 0-arity function symbols (also called constants), includes the variables, and is closed under application of the function symbols. In other words, $\mathrm{Term}(\Sigma, V)$ is the smallest set such that $V\subset\mathrm{Term}( \Sigma, V)$, $\Sigma_0\subset\mathrm{Term}(\Sigma, V)$, and when $x_1, \ldots, x_n\in \mathrm{Term}(\Sigma, V)$ and $f\in\Sigma_n$, then $f(x_1,\ldots,x_n)\in\mathrm{Term}(\Sigma, V)$. A term containing variables is called a pattern, a term without variables is called ground.

An e-graph $E$ represents a ground term $t\in\mathrm{Term}(\Sigma, \emptyset)$ if one of its e-classes represents $t$. An e-class $C$ represents $t$ if some e-node $f(i_1,\ldots,i_n)\in C$ does. An e-node $f(i_1,\ldots,i_n)\in C$ represents a term $g(j_1,\ldots,j_n)$ if $f=g$ and each e-class $M[i_k]$ represents the term $j_k$ ($k$ in $1,\ldots,n$).

e-matching is an operation that takes a pattern $p\in\mathrm{Term}(\Sigma, V)$ and an e-graph $E$, and yields all pairs $(\sigma, C)$ where $\sigma\subset V\times\mathbb{id}$ is a substitution mapping the variables in $p$ to e-class IDs and $C\in\mathbb{id}$ is an e-class ID such that the term $\sigma(p)$ is represented by $C$. There are several known algorithms for e-matching, the relational e-matching algorithm is based on worst-case optimal joins and is worst-case optimal.

== Extraction ==
Given an e-class and a cost function that maps each function symbol in $\Sigma$ to a natural number, the extraction problem is to find a ground term with minimal total cost that is represented by the given e-class. This problem is NP-hard. There is also no constant-factor approximation algorithm for this problem, which can be shown by reduction from the set cover problem. However, for graphs with bounded treewidth, there is a linear-time, fixed-parameter tractable algorithm.

== Complexity ==
- An e-graph with n equalities can be constructed in O(n log n) time.

== Equality saturation ==
Equality saturation is a technique for building optimizing compilers using e-graphs. It operates by applying a set of rewrites using e-matching until the e-graph is saturated, a timeout is reached, an e-graph size limit is reached, a fixed number of iterations is exceeded, or some other halting condition is reached. After rewriting, an optimal term is extracted from the e-graph according to some cost function, usually related to AST size or performance considerations.

== Applications ==
E-graphs are used in automated theorem proving. They are a crucial part of modern SMT solvers such as Z3 and CVC4, where they are used to decide the empty theory by computing the congruence closure of a set of equalities, and e-matching is used to instantiate quantifiers. In DPLL(T)-based solvers that use conflict-driven clause learning (also known as non-chronological backtracking), e-graphs are extended to produce proof certificates. E-graphs are also used in the Simplify theorem prover of ESC/Java.

Equality saturation is used in specialized optimizing compilers, e.g. for deep learning, linear algebra and auto-vectorization for digital signal processors. Equality saturation has also been used for translation validation applied to the LLVM toolchain.

E-graphs have been applied to several problems in program analysis, including fuzzing, abstract interpretation, and library learning.
