= University of Lyon =

Cluster of several higher education institutions in Lyon, France

- Université de Lyon
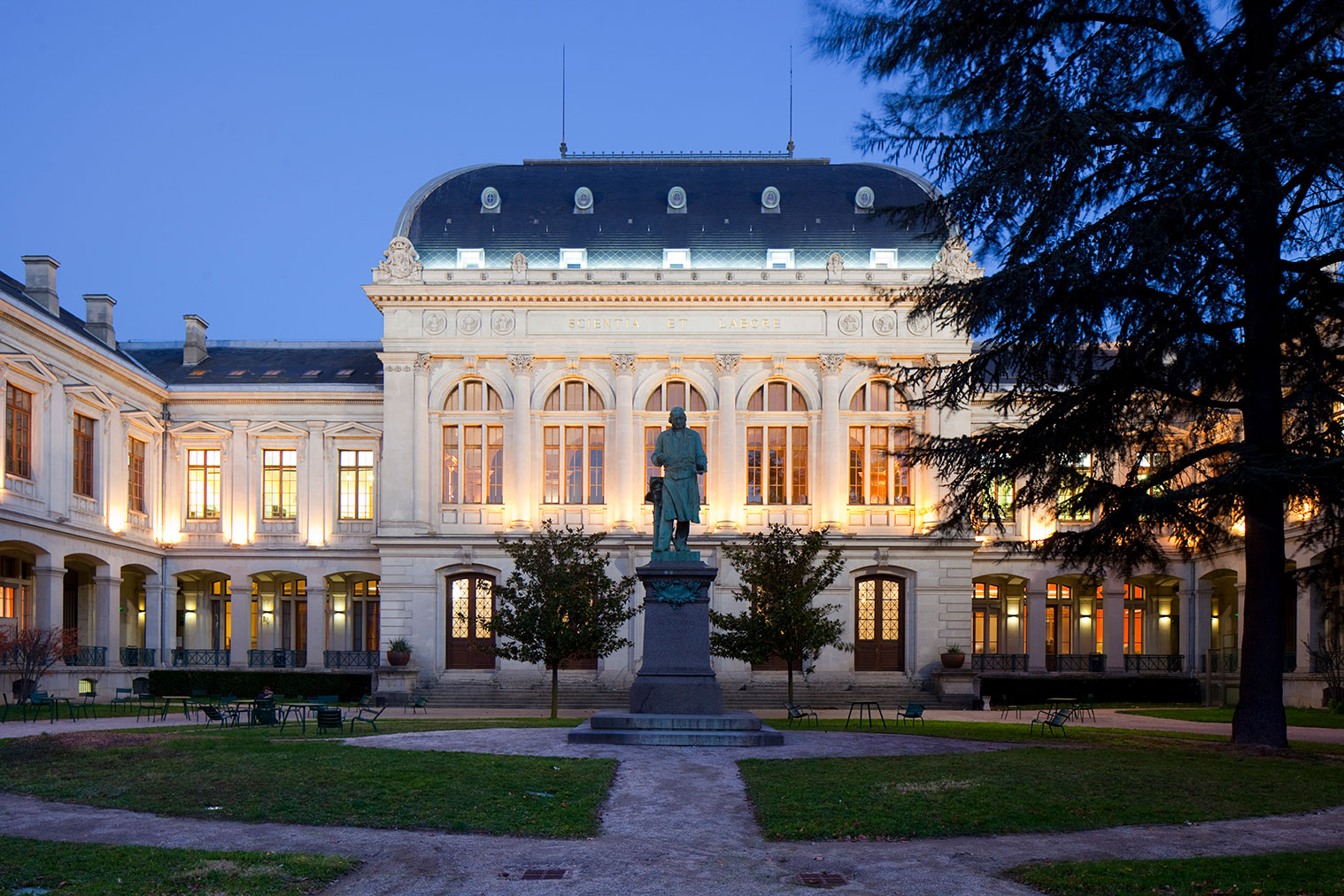
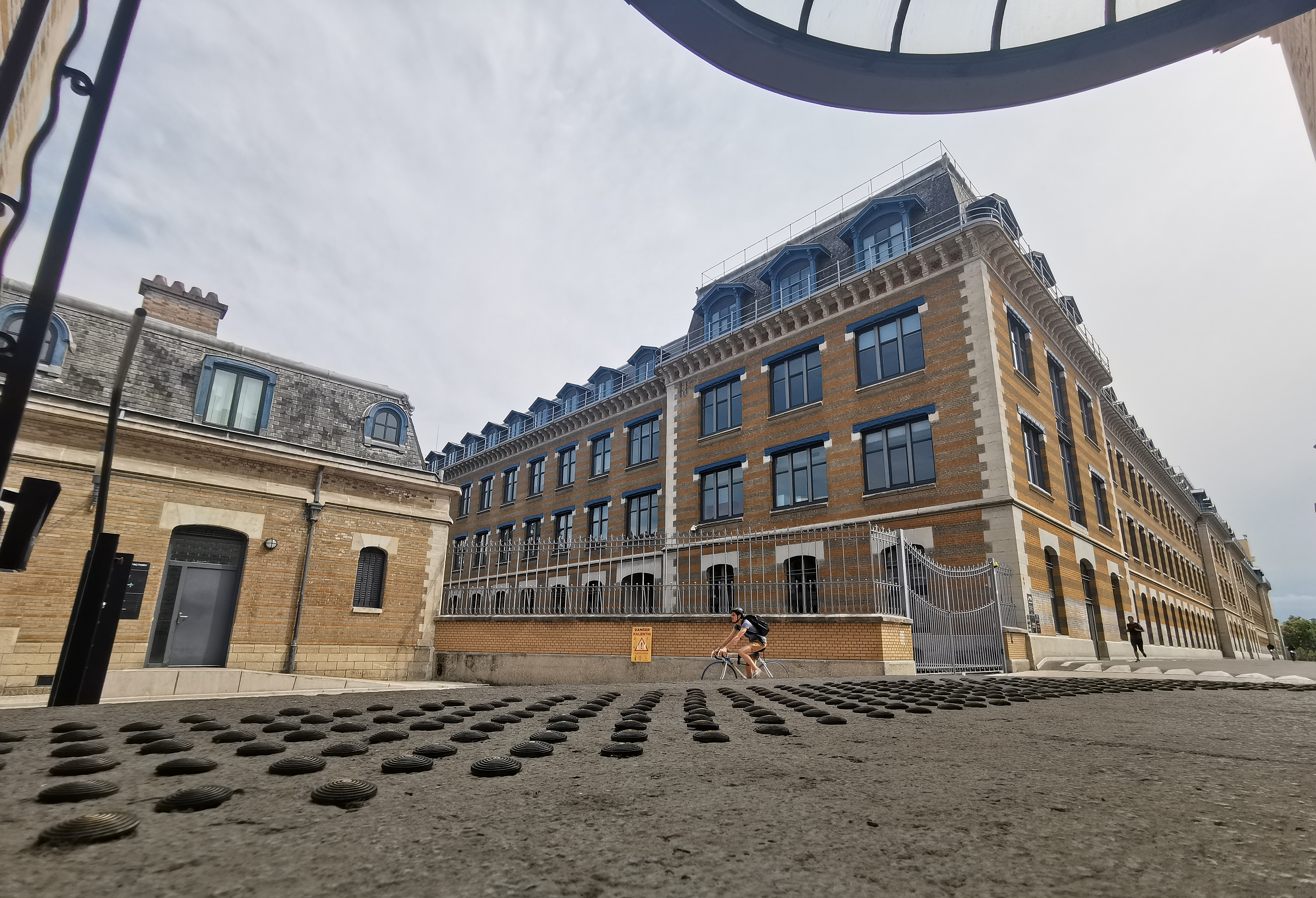
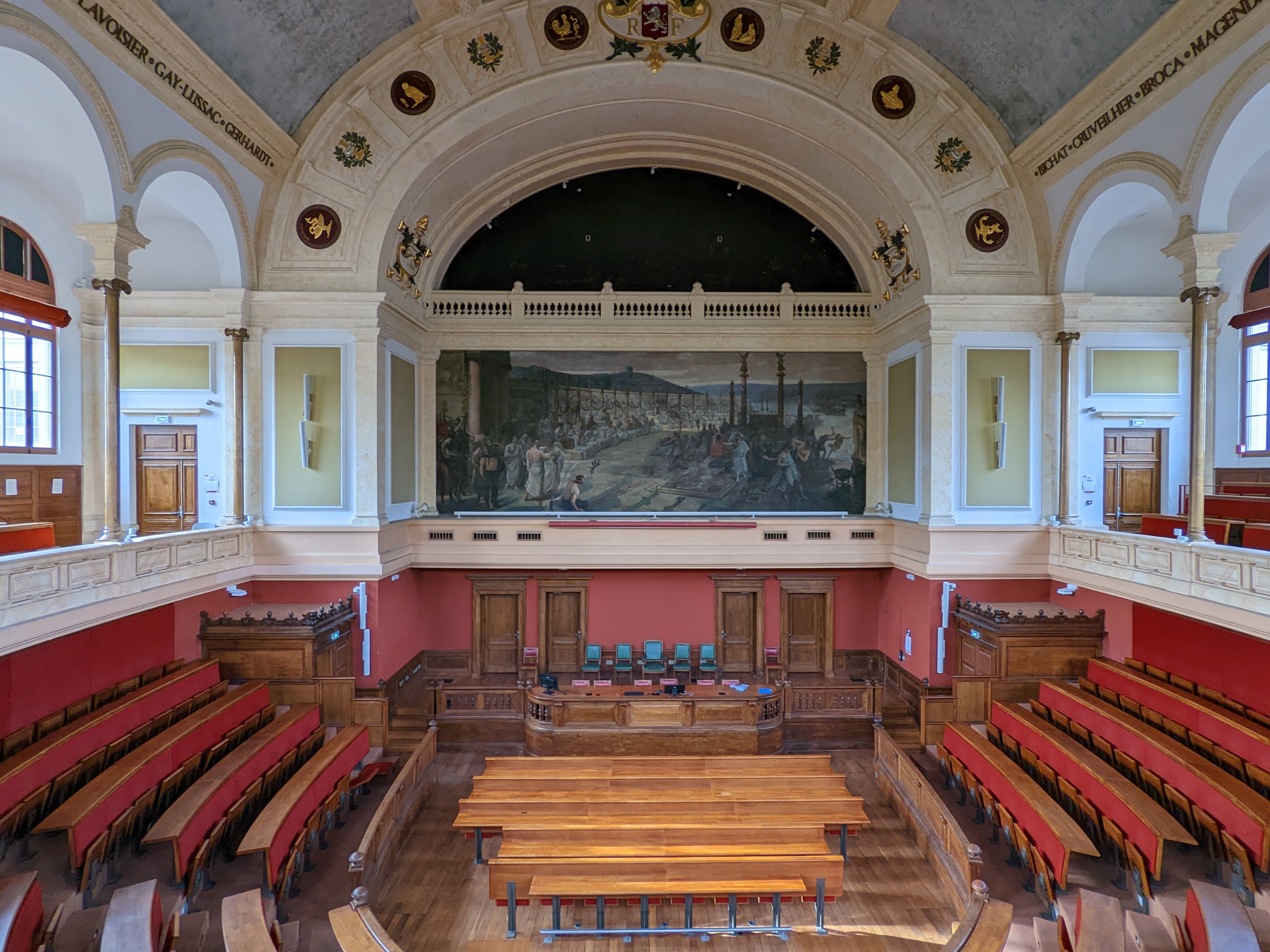
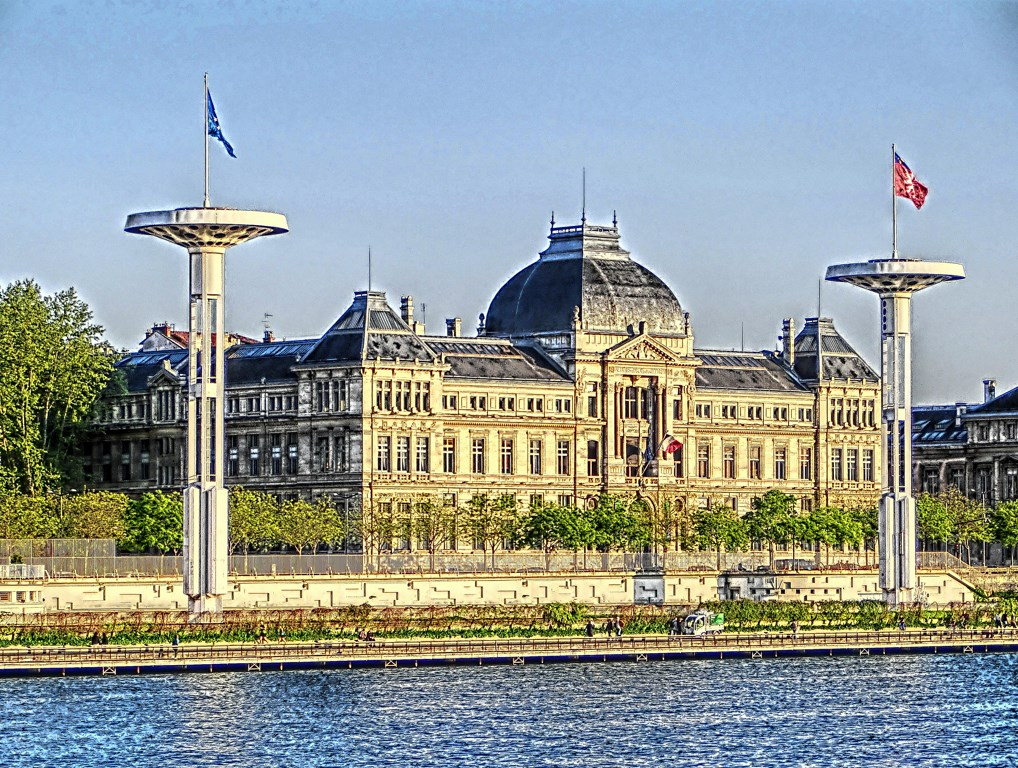
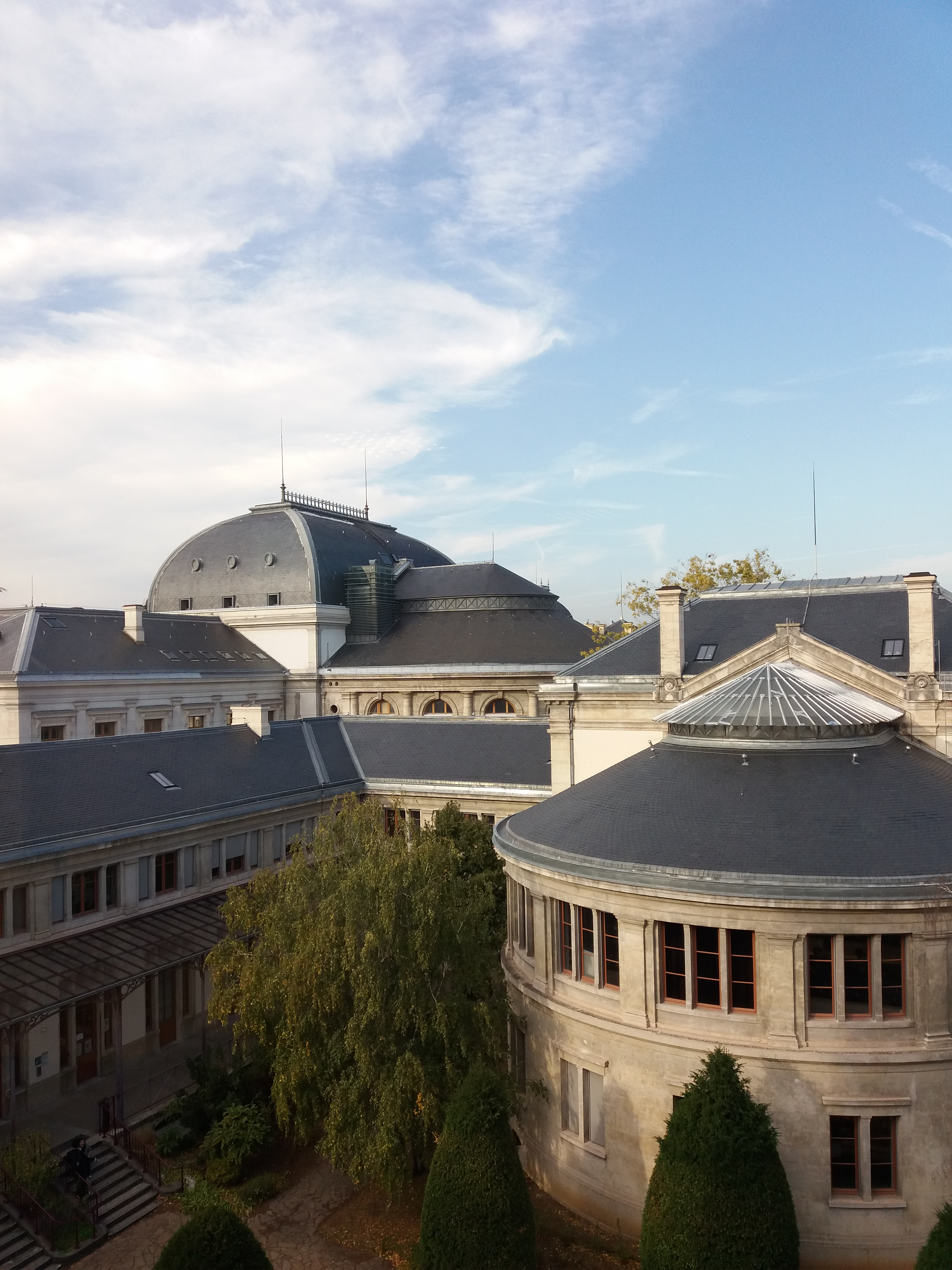
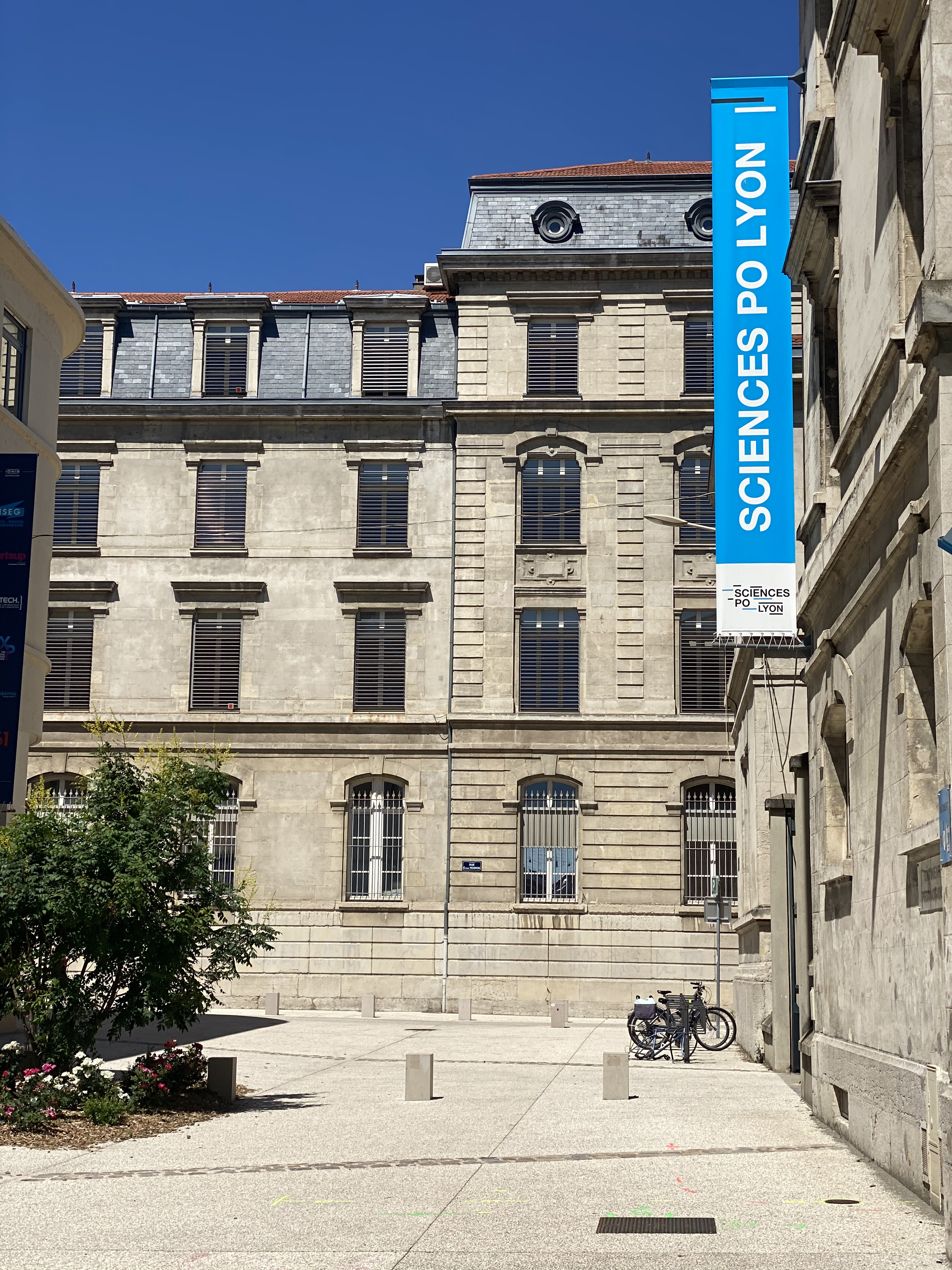
- Motto: Scienta et Labore
- Type: Public
- Established: 1896; 130 years ago (as a university); 1995; 31 years ago (as a university hub); 2007; 19 years ago (as a university system)
- Endowment: €4,000,000 over two years
- President: Pr. Nathalie Dompnier
- Faculty: 5,000
- Administrative staff: 11,500
- Students: 145,000
- Doctoral students: 5,000
- Location: 92, rue Pasteur 69361, Lyon, Auvergne-Rhône-Alpes, France; 45.748151°N 4.852352°E
- Campus: Multiple campuses
- Colors: Blue and Black
- Website: www.universite-lyon.fr

The University of Lyon (French: Université de Lyon, UdL) is a university system (ComUE) based in Lyon, France. It comprises 12 members and 9 associated institutions. The three main constituent universities in this center are: Claude Bernard University Lyon 1, which focuses upon health sciences and science studies with about 47,000 students; Lumière University Lyon 2, which focuses upon the social sciences and arts with about 30,000 students; Jean Moulin University Lyon 3, which focuses upon law, business administration, languages and humanities with about 20,000 students.

Following Paris and Toulouse, Lyon stands as France's third-largest university hub. Hosting 129,000 students, 11,500 educators and researchers, along with 510 private and public laboratories, it encompasses the city's three faculties (Lyon-1, Lyon-2, and Lyon-3), alongside the Jean Monnet University of Saint-Étienne, École Centrale de Lyon, École Normale Supérieure de Lyon, and the Institut d'Etudes Politiques de Lyon. The Centre National de la Recherche Scientifique, France's public institution for scientific research, is a vital member of this university network.

Collaboratively, private and public higher education institutions in the Lyon region pool resources to advance and promote scientific research. Originally established between 1896 and 1968 as a centralized university amalgamating three historical faculties (sciences, arts, medicine, and law), the University of Lyon was split into three universities under the Edgar Faure law. Twenty-five years later, the university system of Lyon was created in accordance with each institution's autonomy.

== History ==
Lyon has historically been an industrious and mercantile city, oriented towards free trade and commerce due to its geographical location: at the confluence of the Saône and Rhône rivers, near Switzerland and Italy, on the route between northern and southern Europe. Primarily a merchant city under the Ancien Régime, Lyon does not have a long university history: this delay is partly due to the fear that education would divert young people from commerce and industry. The first modern higher education institution in Lyon was established in 1519 under the initiative of the Brotherhood of the Trinity (Confrérie de la Trinité). On 21 July 1527, following its success, the institution came under the control of the Lyon municipality, which then assumed financial responsibility for it. The institution became the Collège Confrérie de la Trinité. It was the first coeducational institution, notably welcoming poets Louise Labé and Pernette du Guillet during the Renaissance. In the 16th century, this university college was an influential humanist centre. Amidst the religious wars between Catholic and Huguenots, the director of the institution, the poet Barthélemy Aneau, was massacred in 1561, accused of sympathising with the Reformation. In 1565, Pope Pius IV confirmed the transfer of the college’s administration to the Jesuits, a transfer later validated in 1568 by King Charles IX of France. The college expanded in the 17th century, with the works financed by Queen Anne of Austria. Besides a theatre, a library, and an observatory, the Collège de la Trinité incorporated numerous buildings not primarily intended for education, including eight congregation chapels. To construct buildings specifically for boarders, the Jesuits began acquiring properties from the 1680s onwards, with acquisitions peaking between 1712 and 1713. In 1702, an astronomical observatory was built atop the Trinity Chapel, driven by astronomer Jean de Saint-Bonnet. In 1763, following the suppression of the Jesuit order in France, the Lyon municipality ordered the institution’s takeover by the Oratorian order. Like all universities and higher education institutions of the Ancien Régime, the Collège de la Trinité was abolished by the National Convention on 15 September 1793 during the Revolution, on the grounds that they were too aristocratic and did not align with the revolutionaries' vision of public education accessible to all.

In 1806, Napoleon I established the University of France, an institution that centralised all faculties in France. Ephemeral faculties of arts and sciences were created in Lyon during this period but were abolished during the Bourbon Restoration in 1815. At the beginning of the 19th century, it had a total of 2,551 students, making it the largest university in the country after Paris. The modern faculties, ancestors of the University of Lyon, were established under the July Monarchy: the Faculty of Sciences of Lyon opened its doors in 1833, the Faculty of Letters in 1838, the Faculty of Theology in 1839 (transformed into the Catholic Faculty in 1885), the Faculty of Law in 1875 by decree of President Mac Mahon, and the Faculty of Medicine and Pharmacy in 1877.

Flourishing as a prominent research hub for Egyptological studies since the late 19th century, Lyon witnessed the birth of the Institute of Egyptology in 1879. In 1975, Egyptological studies found a home in the Victor Loret Institute of the Centre National de la Recherche Scientifique (CNRS), alongside the creation of the Maison de l'Orient et de la Méditerranée.

The law of 10 July 1896 formally created the University of Lyon, composed of these faculties. Each faculty maintained a high degree of autonomy despite sharing what was then known as the Palais des Facultés, now the Palais Hirsch, located on the left bank of the Rhône at Quai Claude-Bernard. By 1920, Lyon had over 3,500 university students, making it the second largest university in the country after Paris, which had 17,000 students. The University of Lyon in this centralised form existed until 1968.

As with all universities in France, following the events of May 1968, the University of Lyon was replaced by autonomous faculties. The Edgar Faure law aimed to grant greater autonomy to faculties and break with the highly centralised vision that had governed higher education in France since 1896. The law provided a legal status of autonomy to the faculties, that of "public establishments of a scientific and cultural nature." The University of Lyon was then divided into three autonomous entities: University Lyon-I - Claude Bernard (former faculty of medicine and pharmacy, now a university of sciences), University Lyon-II - Lumière (former faculty of letters, now a university dedicated to the humanities, social sciences, and arts), and University Lyon-III - Jean Moulin (former faculty of law, now a university dedicated to law and political science). The University of Sciences Lyon-I is named Claude Bernard in honour of this eminent physiologist and scientist; the University of Lyon-II is named Lumière in reference to the brothers Louis and Auguste Lumière, the inventors of cinema; the University Lyon-III is named Jean Moulin in honour of the prefect and resistance leader during World War II, who unified the French Resistance and died under torture by the Gestapo in Lyon in 1943.

== Structure ==
After Paris and Toulouse, Lyon is the third largest university city in France with 2,335 students in 1898, 36,500 students in 1973, 42,600 students in 1978, 50,000 students in 1982, and 52,000 students in 1985; in 2024, Lyon has 175,000 students, including 23,000 international students, and 11,500 researchers and faculty members. The university has a total of 510 private and public laboratories, and an average of 800 doctoral theses are defended there each year. The university comprises a total of 510 private and public laboratories, 18 doctoral schools, and an average of 800 doctoral theses are defended there each year. The doctoral schools are divided into five categories: life sciences (biological sciences, health, neurobiology, sciences and cognition, cancerology and biology), exact sciences (electronics and electrotechnics, mechanics and civil engineering, chemistry, materials, engineering, computer science and mathematics, physics and astrophysics), and humanities and social sciences (social sciences, literature, languages and linguistics, education and psychology, economics and management, philosophy and history, law).

The ComUE Lyon Saint-Étienne, on behalf of its member institutions, oversees several major projects related to the "Investments for the Future" programme, for which it has secured nearly one billion euros in funding. As part of these major projects, 12 laboratories have been awarded the "Laboratoire d'Excellence" (LabEx) label, and 8 projects have received the "Equipement d'Excellence" (EquipEx) label from the Ministry of Higher Education, Research and Innovation. Additionally, 3 of its research institutes have been awarded the Carnot label, which is given to public research laboratories conducting scientific research in public-private partnerships.

As part of the France 2030 programme, launched in 2021 by the French government with a total budget of €54 billion, the ComUE Lyon Saint-Étienne has established a technology transfer acceleration company (société d'Accélération du Transfert de Technologies, SATT). This subsidiary, created by one or more institutions (universities and research organisations), aims to professionalise the valorisation of public research. The company is responsible for managing patent applications, proof-of-concept operations, startup creation, and licensing. Lyon's SATT, called PULSALYS, has a budget of €57 million over 10 years to strengthen the collaboration between fundamental research and entrepreneurship.

== Members ==
Constituent universities

- Claude Bernard University Lyon 1
- Lumière University Lyon 2
- Jean Moulin University Lyon 3
- Jean Monnet University

Grandes Écoles

- École Normale Supérieure de Lyon
- École Centrale de Lyon
- École Nationale des Travaux Publics de l'État (ENTPE)
- INSA Lyon
- Institut d'Études Politiques de Lyon (Sciences Po Lyon)
- VetAgro Sup (previously École Nationale Vétérinaire de Lyon)
- École Nationale d'Ingénieurs de Saint-Étienne (ENISE)
- Centre National de la Recherche Scientifique (CNRS)

== Notable alumni ==
Distinguished alumni and faculty of the University of Lyon include Nobel laureates such as Victor Grignard (Chemistry, 1912), Alexis Carrel (Medicine), Roger Guillemin (Medicine 1977), Yves Chauvin (Chemistry, 2005), and Jean Jouzel (co-laureate of the Nobel Peace Prize, 2007). Notable figures also include Ume Kenjirō, architect of the Japanese civil code and former law faculty student, Cédric Villani, Fields Medal recipient and alumnus of Lyon-III, astrophysicist Hélène Courtois, pioneer of criminal anthropology Alexandre Lacassagne, and Louis Léopold Ollier, founding figure in modern orthopedic surgery.

== Associated institutions ==
- Emlyon Business School
- Université Catholique de Lyon
- École Nationale Supérieure d'Architecture de Lyon
- École Nationale Supérieure d'Architecture de Saint-Etienne
- École Nationale Supérieure des Mines de Saint-Étienne
- École supérieure de commerce et management (ESDES)
- Institut Polytechnique de Lyon (CPE Lyon, ECAM Lyon, ISARA Lyon, ITECH Lyon)
- Ecole Nationale Superieure des Sciences de l'information et des Bibliotheques (ENSSIB)

== See also ==
- CROUS de Lyon
