= Worst-case optimal join algorithm =

Algorithm for computing relational joins

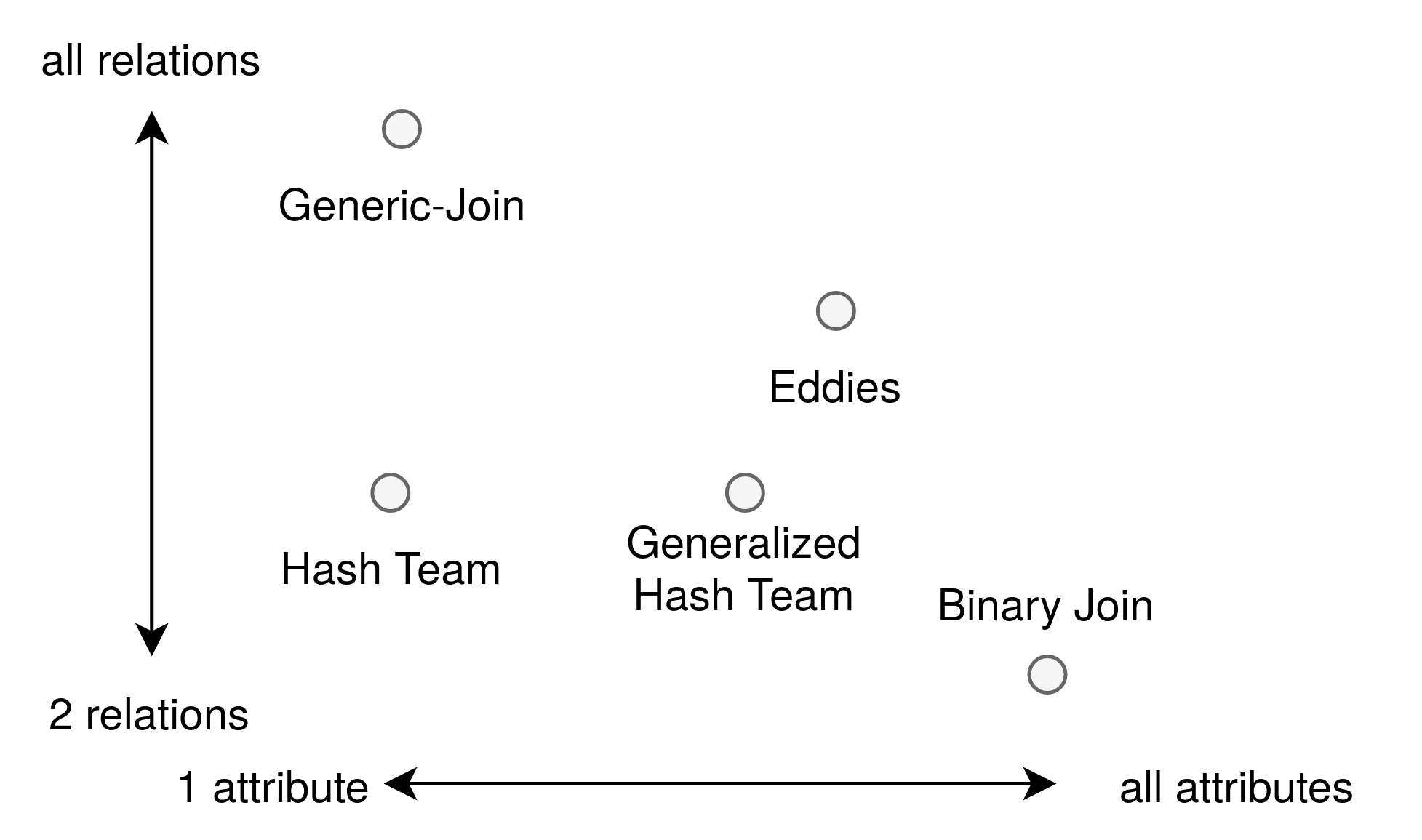
An illustration of properties of join algorithms. When performing a join between more than two relations on more than two attributes, binary join algorithms such as hash join operate over two relations at a time, and join them on all attributes in the join condition; worst-case optimal algorithms such as generic join operate on a single attribute at a time but join all the relations on this attribute.

A worst-case optimal join algorithm is an algorithm for computing relational joins with a runtime that is bounded by the worst-case output size of the join. Traditional binary join algorithms such as hash join operate over two relations at a time; joins between more than two relations are implemented by repeatedly applying binary joins. Worst-case optimal join algorithms are asymptotically faster in worst case than any join algorithm based on such iterated binary joins.

The first worst-case optimal join algorithm, generic join, was published in 2012. Worst-case optimal join algorithms have been implemented in commercial database systems, including the LogicBlox system. Worst-case optimal joins have been applied to build a worst-case optimal algorithm for e-matching.
