= Block nested loop =

Algorithm

A block-nested loop (BNL) is an algorithm used to join two relations in a relational database.

This algorithm is a variation of the simple nested loop join and joins two relations $R$ and $S$ (the "outer" and "inner" join operands, respectively). Suppose $|R| < |S|$. In a traditional nested loop join, $S$ will be scanned once for every tuple of $R$. If there are many qualifying $R$ tuples, and particularly if there is no applicable index for the join key on $S$, this operation will be very expensive.

The block nested loop join algorithm improves on the simple nested loop join by only scanning $S$ once for every group of $R$ tuples. Here groups are disjoint sets of tuples in $R$ and the union of all groups has the same tuples as $R$. For example, one variant of the block nested loop join reads an entire page of $R$ tuples into memory and loads them into a hash table. It then scans $S$, and probes the hash table to find $S$ tuples that match any of the tuples in the current page of $R$. This reduces the number of scans of $S$ that are necessary.

algorithm block_nested_loop_join is
    for each page pr in R do
        for each page ps in S do
            for each tuple r in pr do
                for each tuple s in ps do
                    if r and s satisfy the join condition then
                        yield tuple <r,s>

A more aggressive variant of this algorithm loads as many pages of $R$ as can be fit in the available memory, loading all such tuples into a hash table, and then repeatedly scans $S$. This further reduces the number of scans of $S$ that are necessary. In fact, this algorithm is essentially a special-case of the classic hash join algorithm.

The block nested loop runs in $O(P_r P_s/M)$ I/Os where $M$ is the number of available pages of internal memory and $P_r$ and $P_s$ is size of $R$ and $S$ respectively in pages. Note that block nested loop runs in $O(P_r+P_s)$ I/Os if $R$ fits in the available internal memory.
