= CEA-List: Laboratory for Integration of Systems and Technology =

CEA-List
- CEA-List: Laboratoire d'Intégration de Systèmes et des Technologies
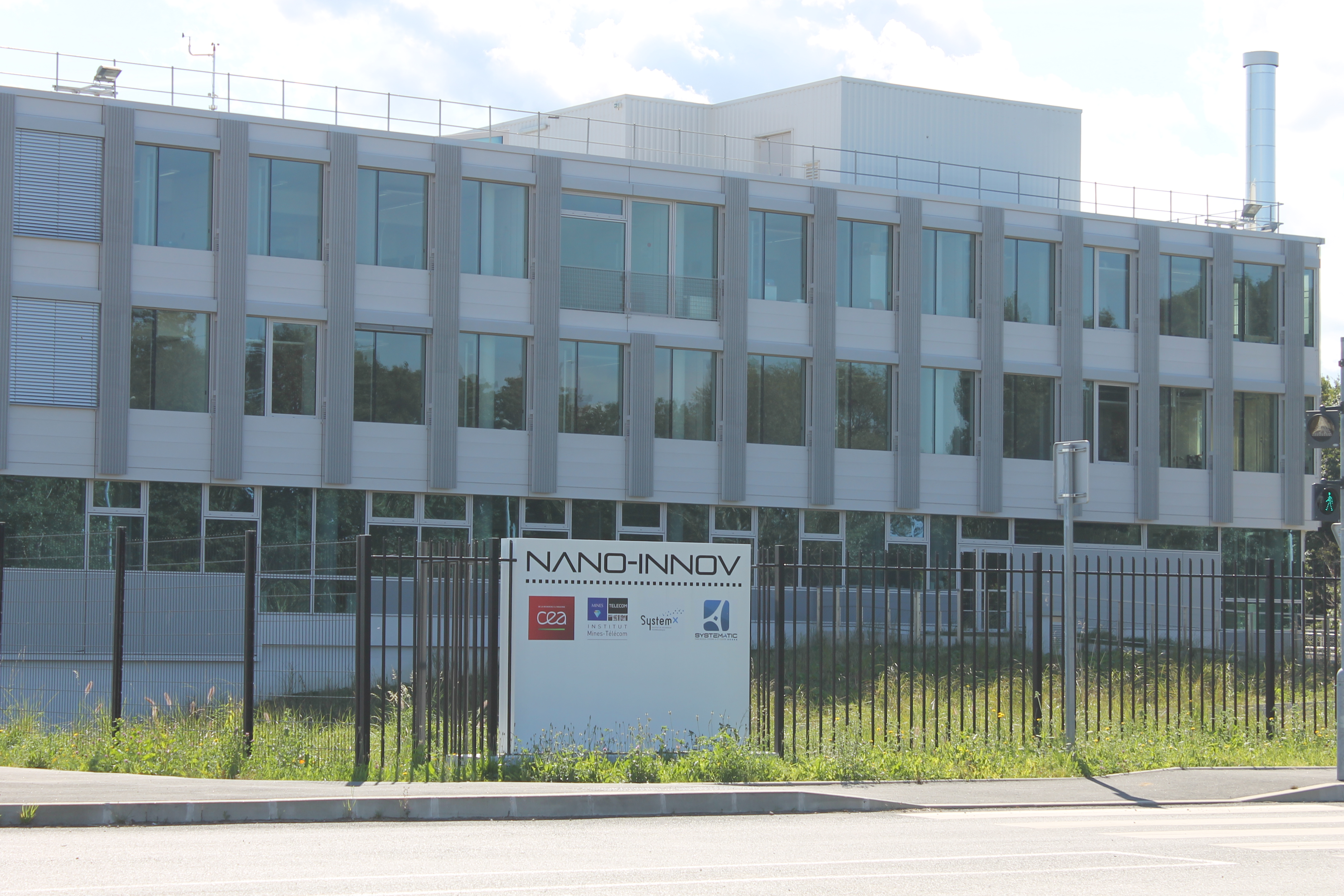
- Nano-INNOV center hosts much of the CEA-List

Agency overview
- Headquarters: Nano-INNOV, Avenue de la Vauve, 91120 Palaiseau, France
- Employees: 750
- Website: list.cea.fr/en

CEA-List (Laboratory for Integration of Systems and Technology; French: Laboratoire d'Intégration des Systèmes et des Technologies) is one of three institutes of the French CEA technological research division CEA Tech. The institute specializes in digital systems. It has the Carnot label.

== Overview ==
Based in Saclay Paris region, France, CEA-List works in partnership with French and foreign industrial companies on applied research projects in four main topics:

- Advanced manufacturing
- Embedded systems
- Data intelligence
- Health ionizing radiations

== Sites ==
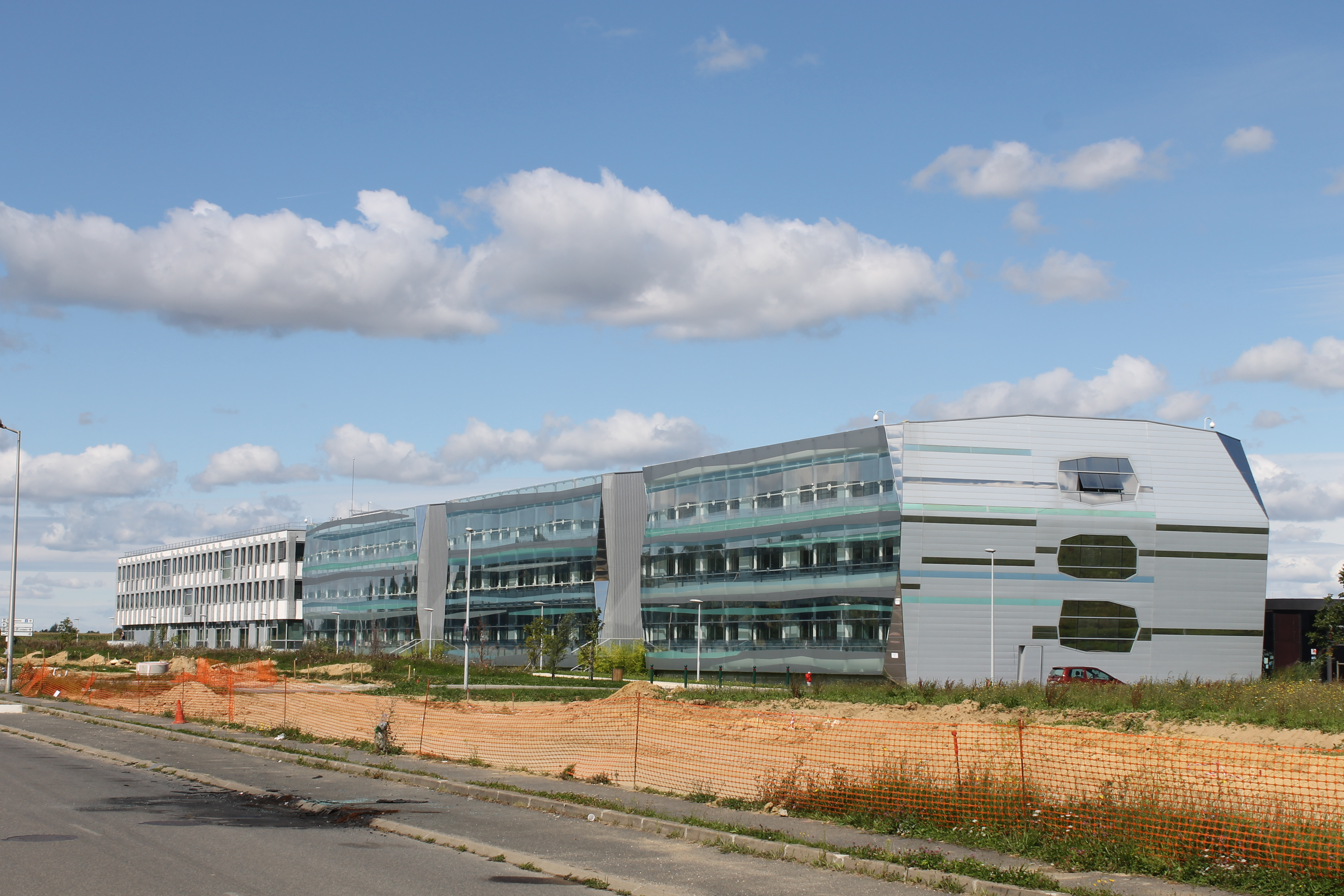
Digiteo site which hosts part of CEA-List among other laboratories

CEA-List is situated at the following sites:

- Centre d'intégration Nano-INNOV
- DOSEO
- Digiteo
- CEA Saclay
- CEA Grenoble

== Research programs ==
CEA-List is involved in various research programs, including:

=== Advanced manufacturing ===
CEA-List, works towards advanced manufacturing by supporting industry to produce in a more effective and sustainable way and involves exploratory research in emerging technology for smart manufacturing such as, modelling and simulation, knowledge engineering, data processing, vision, information and communication systems.

The main activities in context of advanced manufacturing fall into the following six categories:

- Collaborative robotics
- Virtual reality
- Augmented reality
- Non destructive testing
- Instrumentation
- Radioactivity metrology

=== Embedded systems ===
CEA-List, works on various development aspect of software and embedded systems and provides methods, tools and components for optimizing systems’ quality and performance.

Papyrus and Frama-C are one of the well known open source tools being used in various industrial and academic context.

The embedded systems labs consist of a large number of research engineers who dedicate their time to enhance the five topics integrating safety, security, reliability and performance requests. The lab works on the following category of activities:

- Design and analysis
- Validation and verification
- Sensors integration
- IPs and components for reliability, safety and security
- Computing architectures

=== Ambient intelligence ===
CEA-List, works on development of a global approach for ambient intelligence applications which include HMI (Human Machine Interface) aspects, from perception to user’s restitution.

The research is carried out to addresses various industrial sectors and problems, such as, security (video surveillance, pedestrian detection…), health, energy, transport and digital economy (data filtering and analysis, search engines, etc).

A large number of research engineers work on four main application in this fields:

- Diamond material and sensors
- Internet of things
- Data analysis
- Knowledge engineering

=== Radiations control for health ===
CEA-List, works towards improving the safety and efficiency of treatments, to reduce the amount of doses and to develop new therapies.

CEA-List, work on radiations control for health is held by two entities of reference:

1. The Henry-Becquerel National Laboratory (LNHB)
2. National French reference laboratory for metrology

DOSEO platform is unique in France as it consists of advanced technological equipment for imaging and radiotherapy.

The research is conducted in partnership both with the medical body and the industrial sector where many research engineers work on two big topics:

- Calibration tools and does metrology
- Modeling and simulation

== Partnerships ==
=== Scientific partnerships ===
As a member of Carnot institutes network, CEA-List, works both on technological research and on upstream resourcing research. Resourcing activities are based on historical relations with high level academic partners.

=== Industrial partnerships ===
Despite an international economic crisis, there has been a solid growth for CEA-List which testifies its relevant choices concerning its research work priorities and the ability to fulfill the industrial partners’ needs. Concerning large companies, the issue at stake is about designing global industrial solutions within a restricted demanding time to market.

== See also ==
- CEA-Leti
- CEA-Liten
