= CALYM =

Lymphoma research consortium

The CALYM Carnot Institute (Consortium for the Acceleration of Innovation and its Transfer in the Lymphoma Field) is an academic research consortium focusing in lymphoma treatments and diagnosis spanning from new target identification to large international Phase III clinical trials and beyond. CALYM brings together 20 entities with complementary expertise in preclinical, translational and clinical lymphoma research: the Lymphoma Study Association (LYSA), the Lymphoma Academic Research Organisation (LYSARC), and 18 public preclinical research teams in lymphoma based at universities and hospitals across France. The consortium aims at accelerating innovation and its transfer in the lymphoma field, particularly in the translational phase and in the areas of therapeutic, diagnosis and imaging.

The CALYM Carnot institute is managed by Bertrand Nadel. The steering committee of CALYM consortium is led by Guillaume Cartron.

The institute carries the Carnot label, a label of excellence awarded by the French Ministry of Research to public-parapublic research institutes with a strong track record of partnering research. It thus forms part of the Carnot network of Carnot Institutes.

== Overview ==
CALYM is a network of 20 entities: the Lymphoma Study Association (LYSA), the Lymphoma Academic Research Organisation (LYSARC), and 18 laboratories and clinical research groups focused on lymphoma studies in France. Its headquarters are located in Lyon area, France; its steering committee is led by Guillaume Cartron.

CALYM covers all stages of lymphoma research and development (R&D), from fundamental and preclinical research (including new biological targets) to clinical research (up to international phase III registration trials) and also carries out biological studies associated with clinical trials: diagnostics, genetics, immunomonitoring, and pharmacogenomics.

== Research areas ==
CALYM is working within the following research areas:

- Identification and validation of new biological targets and in vitro/in vivo models of lymphoma for preclinical development of drug candidates;
- Identification, validation, patenting and out-licensing of blood and tissue biomarkers to improve diagnostics, guide therapy decisions and predict tumor responses;
- Identification of early signals of pharmacologic activity during Phase I/II clinical trials for translational research (tumor markers, circulating DNA, immunomonitoring, imaging);
- Optimization and exploitation of clinical research-related tools to accelerate development, registration and market access of drug candidates (network of early phase clinical trials, clinical databases, biological collections, network and platform of centralized proofreading of imaging, biometry, long term follow-up of patients)

== Industrial collaborations ==
CALYM has a history of R&D partnerships, that have led to new indications and new drug registration: rituximab, alpha-interferon, etc.
