= Symmetric hash join =

The symmetric hash join is a special type of hash join designed for data streams.

== Algorithm ==
- For each input, create a hash table.
- For each new record, hash and insert into inputs hash table.
  - Test if input is equal to a predefined set of other inputs.
    - If so, output the records.

== See also ==
- Data stream management system
- Data stream mining
