= Catholic University of Lyon =

Private university based in Lyon, France

Coordinates: 45°45′05″N 4°49′37″E

- Université catholique de Lyon; Institut catholique de Lyon
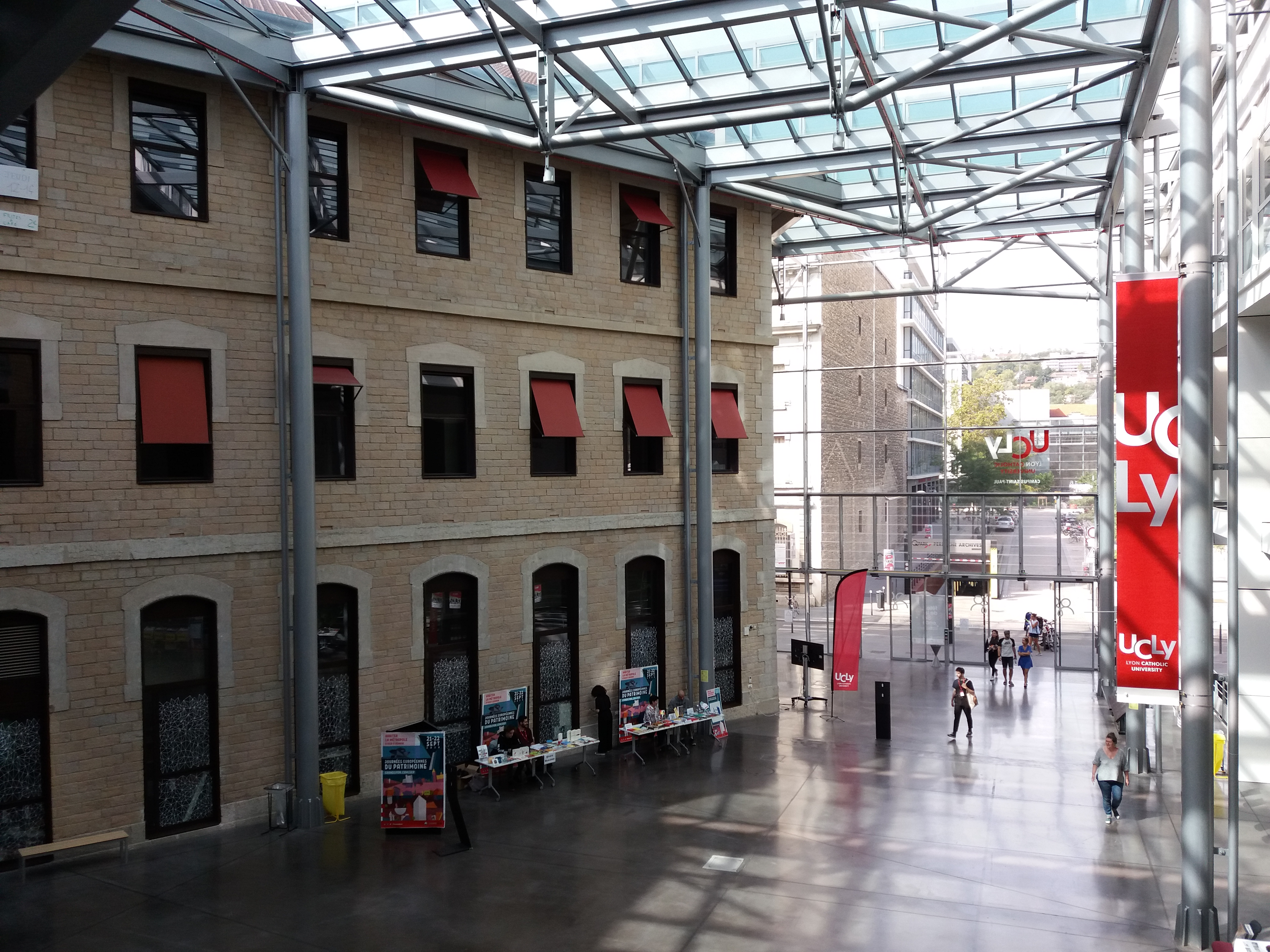
- Lyon 2e - Place des Archives - Campus Saint-Paul de l'UCLy
- Type: Private
- Established: 1875
- President: Grégory Woimbée
- Students: 12,100
- Location: Lyon, France
- Website: www.ucly.fr/en/

The Catholic University of Lyon (UCLy), also known as the Lyon Catholic Institute (French: Institut Catholique de Lyon), is a French private university based in Lyon and Annecy, Southeastern France.

UCLy comprises several faculties, schools and institutes, and enrols French and international students in the humanities and social sciences, law, science, management and languages.

UCLy has the legal status of a non-profit association under French law. It is an associate member of the "University of Lyon" Community of Universities and Institutions.

== Foundation and early years ==
The Lyon Catholic University has stood at the confluence of the Saône and Rhône rivers in the city center of Lyon since its founding. Its creation in 1875 was initiated by lay Catholics following passage of a law on the freedom of higher education. Inaugural classes began in 1875.

=== Historical sites ===
Its first historic site was the Hôtel de Juys, near Place Bellecour. It housed the faculties of philosophy, arts and languages, science and theology, as well as the rectorate, administration and central services, including international relations, communications, academic administration and human development.

Since 2005, the Catholic University of Lyon has been located on two campuses that are close to each other in the city center:

- The Carnot Campus houses the Faculty of Theology and Religious Sciences, the Faculty of Philosophy, The Faculty of Humanities and Social Sciences, the Faculty of Literature and Civilizations including the ESTRI School of Translation and international relations,
- The Saint-Paul Campus houses the Faculty of Law, Political, European and International Studies, the Faculty of Sciences and Health (including ESTBB), the Faculty of Economics and Management (including Lyon Business School, ESDES) together with the rectorate, the university administration, central university services, the Department of Humanities and the 'Lyon Polytechnic Institute'.

In September 2020, UCLy opened a campus in Annecy called “Alpes Europe”. The campus offers UCLy programmes in law, management through ESDES, life sciences through ESTBB, history, and primary-school teacher education.

=== Patron saints ===
Since its foundation, Irenaeus of Lyon and Thomas Aquinas have been the patron saints of the Catholic University of Lyon.

In a brief dated 30 January 1877, Pope Pius IX granted a plenary indulgence to the university’s donors. One of the conditions was that, after confession and communion, they should visit their parish church on the feast days of St Irenaeus and St Thomas Aquinas and pray there for the intentions of the Supreme Pontiff.

The university offers a government-backed diploma in religious freedom and secularism, designed especially for foreign Muslim imams; however, not enough people enroll in it.

== Facts and figures ==
- 12,100 students, including 2,325 from abroad
- 348 permanent teaching staff
- 312 administrative staff
- 7 faculties
- 5 vocational schools

== Organisation and governance ==
The organisation and operation of UCLy are governed by canonical statutes approved by the Holy See (December 2013 statutes) and by the civil statutes of the AFPICL association (Association of the Founders and Protectors of the Catholic Institute of Lyon), a non-profit association under the French law of 1901, recognised as being of public utility on 24 July 2000.

UCLy is headed by a rector, assisted by a board of directors and other governing bodies. The rector is elected by the general assembly of the Association of the Founders and Protectors of the Catholic Institute of Lyon (AFPICL), which includes UCLy's chancellor, the founding bishops and other directors, following a prior vote by representatives of the University Assembly.

Its current rector is Father Grégory Woimbée, who holds doctorates in history and theology. He took office on 1 July 2024, succeeding Father Olivier Artus, who had succeeded Fathers Thierry Magnin and Michel Quesnel.

== Types of courses ==
=== Faculties ===
- Faculty of Law, Political, European and International Studies
- Faculty of Philosophy
- Faculty of Humanities and Social Sciences
- Faculty of Theology and Religious Sciences
- Faculty of Sciences and Health (Biology, biological and medical sciences)
- Faculty of Art and Civilizations
- Faculty of Economics and Management

=== Schools ===
- ESDES Business School
- ESTRI School of Translation and International Relations
- ESQESE School of Environmental Quality and Safety
- ESTBB Engineering School of Biotechnology
- IFTLM School for Medical Laboratory Technicians
- ILCF Lyon Institute of French Language and Culture

=== Training and research centres ===
- Lyon Institute of Human Rights (IDHL)
- Pastoral Institute for Religious Studies (IPER)
- Institute for Society and the Family (ISF)
- International Centre for Local Development Studies (CIEDEL)
- The Centre for Educational Studies, Experimentation and Advice (CEPEC), now independent from UCLy
- The EPi-PSY Teaching Chair (ESTBB), which studies and teaches interactions between neurological and psychiatric disorders in partnership with Saint Joseph Saint Luc Hospital and the La Teppe Institute

=== Lyon Polytechnic Institute ===
The Lyon Polytechnic Institute (IPL) brings together four engineering schools associated with the Catholic University of Lyon:

- Lyon School of Chemistry, Physics and Electronics (CPE Lyon)
- Catholic School of Arts and Crafts (ECAM Lyon)
- Rhône-Alpes Higher Institute of Agriculture and Food Science (ISARA-Lyon)
- Textile and Chemical Institute (ITECH)

== Research ==
Research at the Catholic University of Lyon is conducted and structured within the CONFLUENCE Sciences and Humanities Research Unit, which holds the EA 1598 (Host Research Team 1598) designation awarded by the Ministry of Higher Education following an evaluation by HCERES (High Council for the Evaluation of Research and Higher Education) in June 2020.

The Research Unit combines life and environmental sciences with the humanities and social sciences in its work on human beings, society and the environment.

=== Research organisation ===
CONFLUENCE's activities are organised into eight research areas, including theology, philosophy, biblical studies, languages and cultures, education, law, biosciences and management sciences.

UCLy has a doctoral college authorised to award canonical doctorates in philosophy and theology. The Pierre Gardette Institute (IPG) is a research centre specialising in the languages and cultures of the Auvergne-Rhône-Alpes region, including Franco-Provençal and Occitan.

=== Research themes and programmes ===
The unit's work is structured around three cross-disciplinary themes: ethics, cultures and religions, and vulnerabilities. The latter theme has been developed since 2020 to support joint research across the different areas.

Four cross-disciplinary programmes contribute to the unit's multidisciplinary approach: CArisMA (Christian Anthropology in the Era of Transhumanism and Artificial Intelligence), NHNAI (New Humanism at the Time of Neurosciences and Artificial Intelligence), the "Vulnerabilities" Chair, and the PLURIEL university research platform on Islam.

The unit is associated with the French National Research Agency-funded ACCELER-AI project, which concerns the development of a trustworthy AI ethics framework, and the Household Waste project, which concerns technologies and socio-economic analyses applied to recycling.

=== Publications and dissemination of research ===
- CONFLUENCE: Sciences & Humanities Review: a biannual multidisciplinary scholarly journal of the Research Unit
- "Science – History – Philosophy" series: a book series co-published by the CONFLUENCE Research Unit and Librairie philosophique J. Vrin, dedicated to works that take a philosophical, historical and/or ethical perspective on science
- Théophilyon: a scholarly journal of UCLy's faculties of theology and philosophy
- Sémiotique et Bible: a UCLy journal specialising in biblical studies and language sciences

== Recognition and accreditations ==
=== EESPIG designation ===
UCLy was awarded the EESPIG (Private Higher Education Institution of General Interest) designation by the Ministry of Higher Education and Research on 12 May 2016. The designation covers all its schools and faculties, including ESTBB and ESDES Business School.

Under the Act of 22 July 2013 on higher education and research (known as the Fioraso Act), the EESPIG designation is reserved for non-profit private institutions that contribute to public-service missions in higher education and research. The designation formalises UCLy’s participation in these public-service missions.

The EESPIG designation is awarded after a comprehensive audit conducted by the High Council for the Evaluation of Research and Higher Education (Hcéres). UCLy’s EESPIG designation was renewed in 2021 until 31 December 2026. Following the 2025–2026 evaluation, Hcéres issued a favourable opinion on its renewal. The designation entails the signing of a multiannual agreement between the State and the institution, setting strategic objectives in line with national higher education and research priorities. It also enables UCLy to receive a State grant and to award university degrees through agreements with public universities.

=== Certification ===
UCLy obtained the national Qualiopi certification for four years following a successful audit by AFNOR Certification in July 2020. The quality certification was issued on 28 July 2020 and covers UCLy’s continuing vocational training, professionalisation contracts and recognition of prior learning (VAE) services.

Qualiopi certification is required for training providers seeking access to public or pooled funding. It certifies the quality of the processes implemented by providers of activities that contribute to skills development. The certification enables continued access to training funding arrangements. Before obtaining Qualiopi, UCLy had been registered as a training provider since 2000, certified by AFNOR under the "Conformité en Formation Professionnelle" standard, and listed on Datadock in 2017.

== University library ==
The main library Henri de Lubac contains 400,000 books and 2,000 journals in the areas of philosophy, history, literature, humanities, natural science and theology.

The library belongs to the SUDOC network ('Service Universitaire de Documentation') which interconnects with some 3,000 libraries elsewhere in France.

== See also ==
- Education in France
- List of modern universities in Europe (1801–1945)
