= Carnot label =

- label Carnot
- Named after: Sadi Carnot
- Director general: Jean-Denis Muller
- Website: www.lereseaudescarnot.fr/en

The Carnot label (French: label Carnot, English: /kɑːrˈnoʊ/ kar-NOH) is an official French label awarded to public research laboratories carrying out scientific research in public–private partnerships. Laboratories that carry the label are also referred to as a Carnot Institute (French: institut Carnot) and form a part of the Carnot network (French: réseau Carnot). Created in 2006, it is awarded by the French Minister of Higher Education and Research, for a renewable five-year period.

Laboratories holding the Carnot label receive public funding, paid by the Agence Nationale de la Recherche. It is calculated according to the volume and growth, over the duration of the partnership, of research contracts established with companies based on their needs. This funding is in addition to that paid by the companies themselves.

The labeling procedure includes a preparatory phase called "Tremplin Carnot", designed for laboratories that do not fully meet the required criteria, but receive specific support.

The name of the label was chosen in honor of the engineer and physicist Sadi Carnot.

== History ==
The Carnot label was created in 2006, in order to help public-private partnerships for innovation, and supports both SMEs as well as larger corporations.

== Organization ==
The Carnot network is managed by the Association of Carnot Institutes (AiCarnot), which has a board of directors. Since 2022, Dr. Jean-Denis Muller is the director general.

== Laboratories with the Carnot label ==
As of March 2024 there are 39 laboratories which have received the Carnot label. A few of them have the term "Carnot" in the name but most do not. Some examples of institutes with the Carnot label include:

- Carnot Institute ARTS
- Inria
- CEA-Leti
- CEA-List
- AP-HP
- Curie Institute
- Institut du cerveau (ICM), or Paris Brain Institute
- Institut Carnot Chimie Balard Cirimat
- CALYM

== See also ==
- Science and technology in France
