= Nested loop join =

Computing algorithm

A nested loop join is a naive algorithm that joins two relations by using two nested loops. Join operations are important for database management.

== Algorithm ==
Two relations $R$ and $S$ are joined as follows:

algorithm nested_loop_join is
    for each tuple r in R do
        for each tuple s in S do
            if r and s satisfy the join condition then
                yield tuple <r,s>

This algorithm will involve n_{r}*b_{s}+ b_{r} block transfers and n_{r}+b_{r} seeks, where b_{r} and b_{s} are number of blocks in relations R and S respectively, and n_{r} is the number of tuples in relation R.

The algorithm runs in $O(|R||S|)$ I/Os, where $|R|$ and $|S|$ is the number of tuples contained in $R$ and $S$ respectively and can easily be generalized to join any number of relations ...

The block nested loop join algorithm is a generalization of the simple nested loops algorithm that takes advantage of additional memory to reduce the number of times that the $S$ relation is scanned. It loads large chunks of relation R into main memory. For each chunk, it scans S and evaluates the join condition on all tuple pairs, currently in memory. This reduces the number of times S is scanned to once per chunk.

== Index join variation ==
If the inner relation has an index on the attributes used in the join, then the naive nest loop join can be replaced with an index join.

algorithm index_join is
    for each tuple r in R do
        for each tuple s in S in the index lookup do
            yield tuple <r,s>

The time complexity for this variation improves from $O(|R||S|) \text{ to } O(|R|\log|S|)$

== See also ==
- Hash join
- Sort-merge join
