= ESDES School of Business and Management =

French business school

Coordinates: 45°45′6″N 4°49′36″E

ESDES Private School of Business and Management
- École supérieure pour le développement économique et social
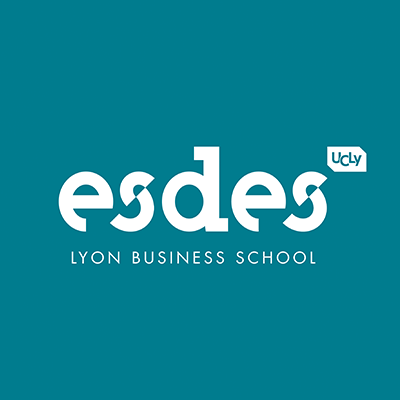
- Type: Private
- Established: 1987
- Location: Lyon, France
- Website: www.esdes.fr

ESDES School of Business and Management (École supérieure pour le développement économique et social) is located in Lyon, France. It was created in 1987, within the Catholic University of Lyon ( UCLy). ESDES is state-recognised and its diploma carries the "visa" of approval and the master's degree of the French Ministry of Education, the master in management program is EPAS accredited. The school is private and part of the Conférence des Grandes Écoles and AACSB accredited.

It delivers several diplomas from Bac +3 to Bac +5 (Master in Management, Bachelor in Business, preparation for the DSCG).

The Grande Ecole Program or Master in management is a Bac + 5 diploma approved by the Ministry of Higher Education and Research and whose holders are awarded the grade of master5. The Grande Ecole Program of ESDES Lyon Business School is EPAS accredited by the EFMD. Admission to the first year of the Grande Ecole program of the ESDES is by the ACCESS Competition and via a parallel admission procedure in the third and fourth years.

The Bachelor in Business is a three-year program. Admission is through an ESDES competition.

== Facts and figures ==
- 1,525 students in 2013
- 202 teachers, 50 of whom are permanent
- 100 links with other universities and business schools in 36 countries
- Two main programs: master's program (5 years), bachelor's program (3 years)
- The master's program is EPAS accredited.
- In 2022, the Financial Times ranked the Masters in Management program 93rd in the world.

== The five year course ==
In accordance with European and international teaching practices, the ESDES course has two stages, a three-year period followed by a two-year period, over which students may develop their career paths. The course is built around the key business skills that students will need in their future careers.

== Master's degree options ==
There are four specializations in full English for the 4th and 5th years: marketing and digital business, digital law and management, international business administration, and international supply chain management.

== International culture ==
Each student takes at least two foreign languages and does at least a six-month study abroad program in an English speaking country, followed by a two-month work placement at the end of the second year. In the fifth year, students may opt to spend one term at one of the school's 100 partner universities or business schools around the world.

International exchange students are welcomed into the International Business Program where they can take classes for transfer credit back to their home universities. Students may take courses in English, French or a mixture of both. Popular courses include portfolio analysis, integrated marketing communications, the European Union, financial analysis, art and architecture and French classes at all levels.

Services provided for exchange students include access to housing, health insurance, academic advising, the Jeunes Ambassadeurs Program, student peer advisors, in addition to a full range of trips and activities which are organized specifically for international exchange students who are studying at ESDES.

An integral part of the exchange student experience are excursions and activities which are accessible to all students, and give them a deeper understanding of the French culture. Excursions to Paris, wine tasting in the Beaujolais, a guided tour of the UN headquarters in Geneva, French cooking classes with a French chef, as well as dinners with local families, visits to museums and ski trip to the Alps are some of the activities on offer.

== Research ==
The GEMO is the research centre at ESDES. The GEMO consists of ESDES faculty with considerable active involvement in research.

Research at the GEMO has several objectives. The first is to contribute to the development of knowledge of organisational science and business management by carrying out fundamental and applied research. The research work is also intended to serve a certain number of pedagogical needs. The research undertaken by the various members of the GEMO acts as the departure point for new course content taught at the school, both in undergraduate and postgraduate programmes and vocational training courses.

== See also ==
- Education in France
