= Z3 Theorem Prover =

Software for solving satisfiability problems

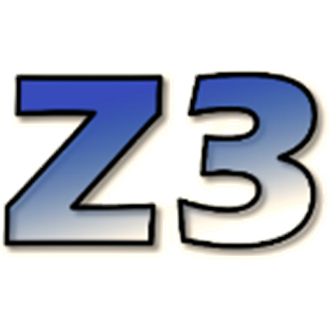
- Original author: Microsoft Research
- Developer: Microsoft
- Release: 2012; 14 years ago
- Stable release: 5.1.0 / 16 August 2026; 52 days ago
- Written in: C++
- Operating system: Windows, FreeBSD, Linux (Debian, Ubuntu), macOS
- Platform: IA-32, x86-64, WebAssembly, arm64
- Type: Theorem prover
- License: MIT License
- Website: github.com/Z3Prover
- Repository: github.com/Z3Prover/z3

Z3, also known as the Z3 Theorem Prover, is a satisfiability modulo theories (SMT) solver developed by Microsoft.

== Overview ==
Z3 was developed in the Research in Software Engineering (RiSE) group at Microsoft Research Redmond and is targeted at solving problems that arise in software verification and program analysis. Z3 supports arithmetic, fixed-size bit-vectors, extensional arrays, datatypes, uninterpreted functions, and quantifiers. Its main applications are extended static checking, test case generation, and predicate abstraction.

Z3 was open sourced in the beginning of 2015. The source code is licensed under MIT License and hosted on GitHub. The solver can be built using Visual Studio, a makefile or using CMake and runs on Windows, FreeBSD, Linux, and macOS.

The default input format for Z3 is SMTLIB2. It also has officially supported bindings for several programming languages, including C, C++, Python, .NET, Java, and OCaml.

Z3 also provides a strategy language that lets users control how the solver attacks a problem. Strategies are built from tactics, which transform a goal into a set of subgoals (for example by simplification, Gaussian elimination, or bit-blasting); tacticals, combinators such as sequencing, alternation, repetition, timeouts and parallel composition that build compound tactics from simpler ones; and probes, which measure properties of a goal so that a strategy can branch on them. The design adapts the tactic framework of LCF-style interactive theorem provers to SMT solving, allowing users to tailor the solver's heuristics to specific classes of problems.

== Examples ==
=== Propositional and predicate logic ===
In this example propositional logic assertions are checked using functions to represent the propositions a and b. The following Z3 script checks to see if $\overline{a \land b} \equiv \overline{a} \lor \overline{b}$:

(declare-fun a () Bool)
(declare-fun b () Bool)
(assert (not (= (not (and a b)) (or (not a)(not b)))))
(check-sat)

Result:

unsat

Note that the script asserts the negation of the proposition of interest. The unsat result means that the negated proposition is not satisfiable, thus proving the desired result (De Morgan's law).

=== Solving equations ===
The following script solves the two given equations, finding suitable values for the variables a and b:

(declare-const a Int)
(declare-const b Int)
(assert (= (+ a b) 20))
(assert (= (+ a (* 2 b)) 10))
(check-sat)
(get-model)

Result:

sat
(model 
  (define-fun b () Int
    -10)
  (define-fun a () Int
    30)
)

== Awards ==
In 2015, Z3 received the Programming Languages Software Award from ACM SIGPLAN. In 2018, Z3 received the Test of Time Award from the European Joint Conferences on Theory and Practice of Software (ETAPS). Microsoft researchers Nikolaj Bjørner and Leonardo de Moura received the 2019 Herbrand Award for Distinguished Contributions to Automated Reasoning in recognition of their work in advancing theorem proving with Z3.

== See also ==
- Formal verification
