= Steve Schneider (computer scientist) =

English computer scientist

- Born: United Kingdom
- Citizenship: United Kingdom
- Education: University of Oxford
- Known for: Formal methods, computer security
- Scientific career
- Fields: Computer science
- Workplaces: Royal Holloway, University of London; University of Surrey
- Doctoral advisor: G. Mike Reed

Steve Schneider FBCS, CITP is an English computer scientist and Professor of Security. He is Director of the Surrey Centre for Cyber Security and Associate Dean (Research and Enterprise) at the University of Surrey.

== Biography ==
Steve Schneider studied at Oxford University, joining the Oxford University Computing Laboratory (now the Oxford University Department of Computer Science) to study for a Doctorate on CSP, which was awarded in 1989, supervised by Mike Reed. He joined Royal Holloway, University of London as a lecturer in 1994, becoming a senior lecturer in 1999 and a professor in 2002. He moved to the University of Surrey in 2004, and was head of the Department of Computer Science from 2004 until 2010.

Schneider is an expert in formal methods, including Communicating Sequential Processes (CSP) and the B-Method, and computer security.

== Selected books ==
- Schneider, Steve (1999). Concurrent and Real Time Systems: the CSP Approach. John Wiley.
- Ryan, Peter Y.A.; Schneider, Steve; Goldsmith, Michael; Lowe, Gavin; Roscoe, Bill (2000). Modelling and Analysis of Security Protocols. Pearson Education.
- Schneider, Steve (2001). The B-Method: An Introduction. Cornerstones in Computer Science. Palgrave. ISBN 0-333-79284-X.
