= Failures-Divergence Refinement =

Failures-divergence refinement may refer to:

- The mathematical relation of refinement in the failures/divergences model of communicating sequential processes
- FDR (software), a refinement-checking software tool
