= Programming Research Group =

Department of the Oxford University Computing Laboratory

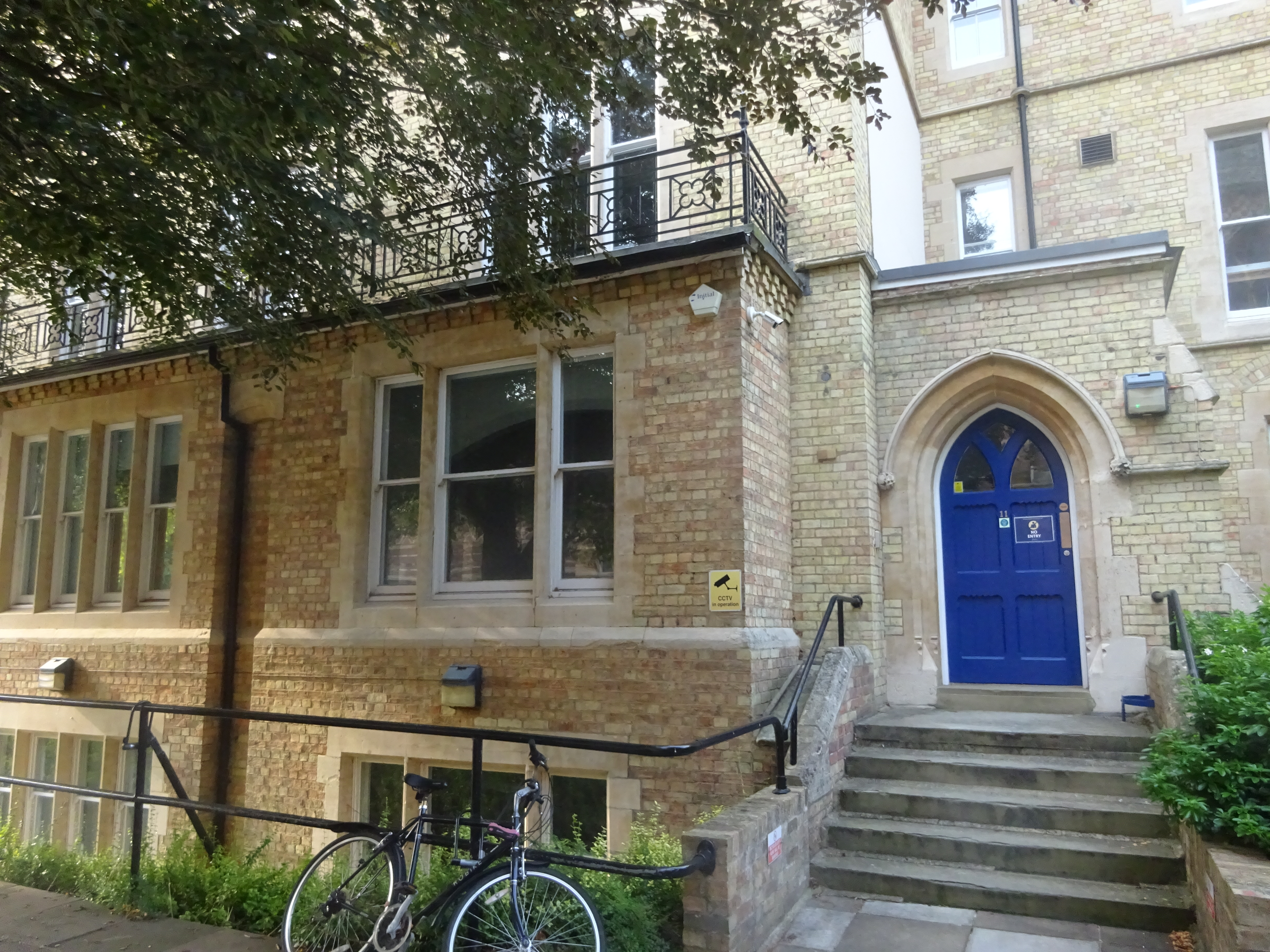
- 11 Keble Road entrance to the PRG
- Abbreviation: PRG
- Merged into: Department of Computer Science, University of Oxford
- Formation: 1965
- Founder: Christopher Strachey
- Founded at: 45 Banbury Road, Oxford, England
- Dissolved: 1 June 2011; 15 years ago
- Merger of: Numerical Analysis Group
- Type: Research group
- Legal status: University group
- Purpose: Computer science research
- Headquarters: 8–11 Keble Road
- Location: Oxford, United Kingdom
- Coordinates: 51.7598°N 1.2585°W
- Methods: Research
- Fields: Computer science
- Official language: English
- Owner: University of Oxford
- Director (1965–1975): Christopher Strachey
- Director (1977–1999): Tony Hoare
- Director (2000–2011): Samson Abramsky
- Main organ: Technical Monographs
- Parent organization: Oxford University Computing Laboratory
- Funding: University of Oxford

The Programming Research Group (PRG) was part of the Oxford University Computing Laboratory (OUCL) in Oxford, England, along with the Numerical Analysis Group, until OUCL became the Department of Computer Science in 2011.

The PRG was founded by Christopher Strachey (1916–1975) in 1965. It was originally located at 45 Banbury Road.

After Strachey's untimely death, C.A.R. Hoare, FRS took over the leadership in 1977. The PRG ethos is summed up by the following quotation from Strachey, found and promulgated by Tony Hoare after he arrived at the PRG:

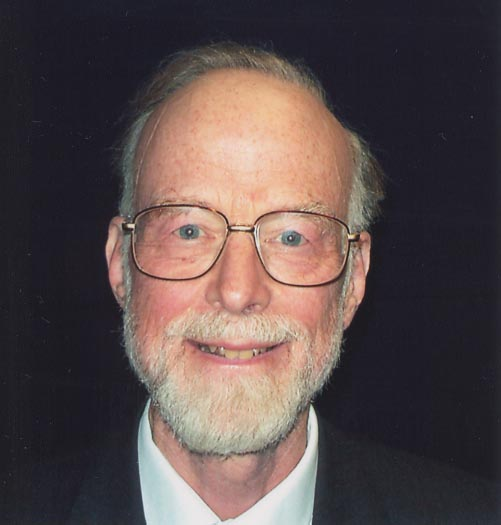
Tony Hoare, leader of the PRG from 1977 to 1999

It has long been my personal view that the separation of practical and theoretical work is artificial and injurious. Much of the practical work done in computing, both in software and in hardware design, is unsound and clumsy because the people who do it have not any clear understanding of the fundamental design principles of their work. Most of the abstract mathematical and theoretical work is sterile because it has no point of contact with real computing. One of the central aims of the Programming Research Group as a teaching and research group has been to set up an atmosphere in which this separation cannot happen.

The PRG moved to 8–11 Keble Road in 1984. During the late 1980s and early 1990s, some members of the PRG were housed at 2 South Parks Road, including Joseph Goguen (who was at the PRG during 1988–1996). Tony Hoare retired in 1999, and the PRG was led by Samson Abramsky from 2000. The PRG continued until the renaming of the Oxford University Computing Laboratory to the Department of Computer Science on 1 June 2011, under the leadership of Bill Roscoe, a former member of the PRG.

The PRG was a centre of excellence in the field of formal methods, playing a leading role in the development of the Z notation (initiated by a visit of Jean-Raymond Abrial) and CSP (together with the associated Occam programming language). It won two Queen's Awards with IBM and Inmos for work in these areas.
