= G. Mike Reed =

American mathematician

- Born: United States
- Citizenship: United States
- Education: Auburn University; University of Oxford
- Known for: Communicating Sequential Processes
- Scientific career
- Fields: Mathematics, computer science
- Workplaces: University of Oxford; UNU-IIST
- Doctoral advisor: Ben Fitzpatrick Jr.; Bill Roscoe
- Doctoral students: Steve Schneider

George Michael Reed is an American computer scientist. He has contributed to theoretical computer science in general and CSP in particular.

Mike Reed has a doctorate in pure mathematics from Auburn University, United States, and a doctorate in computation from Oxford University, England. He has an interest in mathematical topology.

Reed was a Senior Research Associate at NASA Goddard Space Flight Center. From 1986 to 2005, he was at the Oxford University Computing Laboratory (now the Oxford University Department of Computer Science) in England where he was also a Fellow in Computation of St Edmund Hall, Oxford (1986–2005). In 2005, he became Director of UNU/IIST, Macau, part of the United Nations University.
