= Gavin Lowe (computer scientist) =

British academic

- Education: Oxford University
- Scientific career
- Fields: Computer Science
- Workplaces: University of Oxford (from 2000) University of Leicester (until 2000)
- Thesis: Probabilities and Priorities in Timed CSP (1993)
- Doctoral advisor: Bill Roscoe

Gavin Lowe is a British academic. He is a professor of computer science and tutorial fellow at St Catherine's College, Oxford, a professor at the University of Oxford, and President of the Senior Common Room of St Catherine's College, Oxford. His research interests include computer security, for which he developed the cryptographic protocol analysis tool Casper, and concurrency.

== Education ==
Lowe studied mathematics as an undergraduate at St John's College, Oxford, then took an MSc in computation at the University of Oxford. He undertook a DPhil at St Hugh's College, Oxford, writing a thesis titled Probabilities and Priorities in Timed CSP. He published a paper detailing an attack on the Needham–Schroeder protocol, as well as a method to fix the issue, in 1995. The fixed version of the protocol described in the paper is referred to as the Needham–Shroeder–Lowe protocol.

== Career ==
His research interests have included computer security, for which he developed the cryptographic protocol analysis tool Casper. This tool translates a security protocol description into CSP, which is then processed by the FDR refinement checker. Recently, he has moved to researching the field of concurrency.

He was Program Co-chair of the Joint Workshop on Automated Reasoning for Security Protocol Analysis and Issues in the Theory of Security in 2010.

Lowe is a distinguished teacher, having won teaching awards in 2008 and 2010. Along with Peter Millican, he is responsible for the development and establishment of a new joint degree in Computer Science and Philosophy at the University of Oxford in 2012.

== Personal life ==
Lowe enjoys caving. He was the secretary of the Oxford University Cave Club from 1988 to 1989, and tackle master in 1990.
