= Augusto Sampaio =

Brazilian computer scientist

Augusto Cezar Alves Sampaio
- Born: 1964 (age 61–62); Recife, Pernambuco, Brazil
- Education: Federal University of Pernambuco (BSc, MSc); University of Oxford (DPhil)
- Known for: Formal methods, language semantics, model transformations
- Awards: Commander of the Scientific Merit Order (2013)
- Scientific career
- Thesis: An algebraic approach to compiler design (1993)
- Doctoral advisor: Prof. Sir Tony Hoare
- Website: cin.ufpe.br/~acas

Augusto Cezar Alves Sampaio (born 1964) is a Brazilian computer scientist who works with formal methods and language semantics.

Augusto Sampaio is from Recife, Pernambuco, Brazil. He graduated from the Centro de Informática (CIn) at the Federal University of Pernambuco (UFPE) (with a BSc degree in 1985 and MSc degree in 1988). He undertook his PhD studies under the supervision of Prof. Sir Tony Hoare at the Oxford University Computing Laboratory (finishing in 1993). In 2013, Sampaio became Commander of the Scientific Merit Order, awarded by the Brazilian Science and Technology Ministry. In July 2016 Sampaio received the title of Doctor Honoris Causa from the University of York, UK.

Sampaio is a professor at the Federal University of Pernambuco. His main contributions are in the area of model transformations and automatic generation of test from formal models.
