= Michael Goldsmith (computer scientist) =

British computer scientist

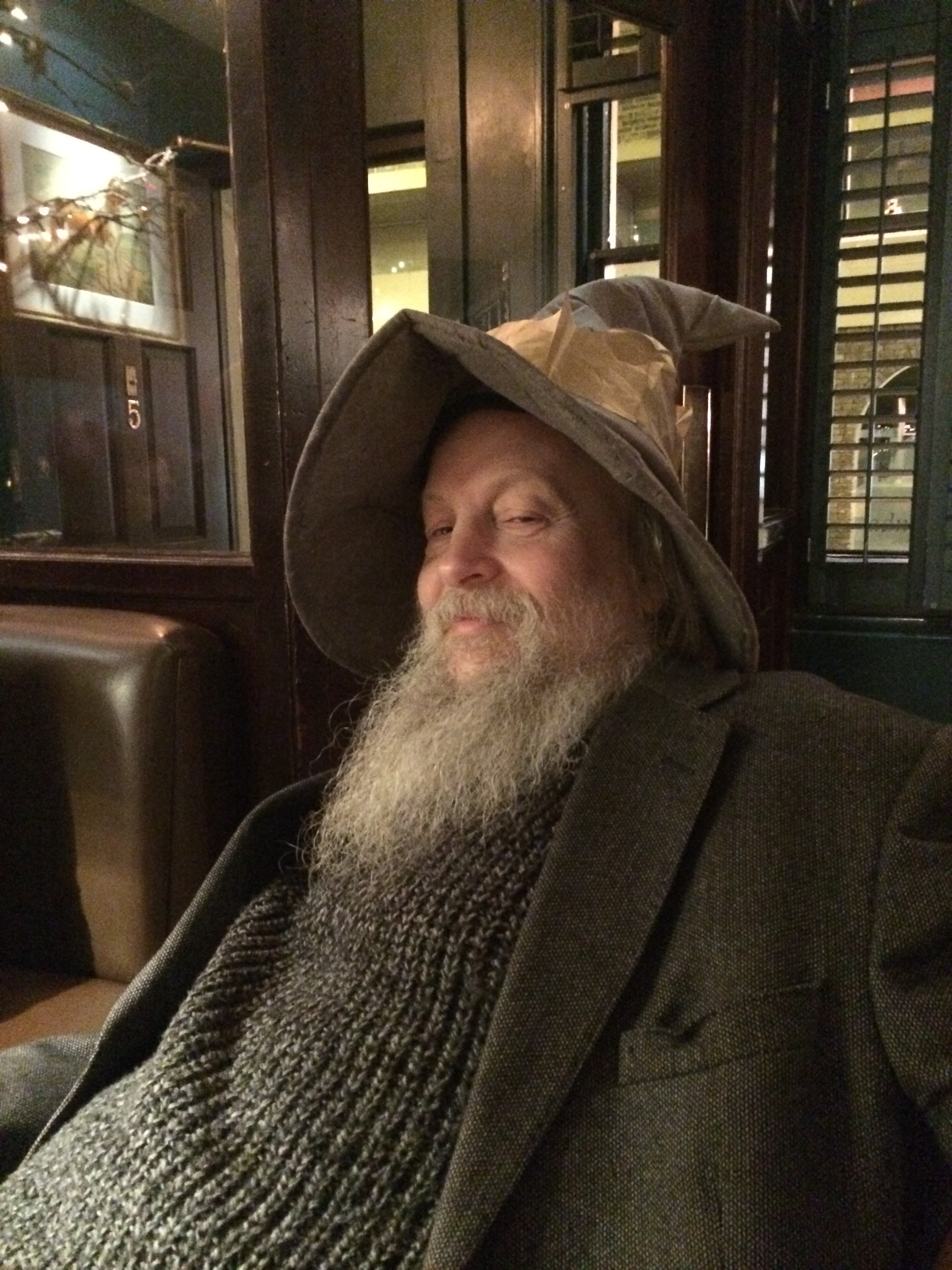
Michael Goldsmith

Michael Goldsmith (born 1959) is a British computer scientist, senior research fellow and Lecturer at the University of Oxford, England. He is a member of Oxford University's Department of Computer Science. He is an associate director of Oxford University's Cyber Security Centre, and an Oxford Martin Fellow of The Global Cyber Security Capacity Centre. He is a fellow of Worcester College, Oxford.

== Career ==
Goldsmith is a senior research fellow at the University of Oxford's Computer Science Department, From 2006 to 2011 he was principal fellow: High-Integrity Techniques in the e-Security Group of the WMG Digital Laboratory in the University of Warwick.

== Publications ==
Goldsmith's publications cover security, cryptography in general, CSP, and formal methods in particular.
