= Computer Laboratory =

Computer Laboratory or Computing Laboratory may refer to:

- A computer lab, a room containing one shared mainframe or multiple workstations for an organisation or community.
- The Department of Computer Science and Technology at the University of Cambridge, formerly the Computer Laboratory
- The Department of Computer Science, at the University of Oxford, formerly the Computing Laboratory
