= PlusCal =

Formal specification language created by Leslie Lamport

PlusCal (formerly called +CAL) is a formal specification language created by Leslie Lamport, which transpiles to TLA^{+}. In contrast to TLA^{+}'s action-oriented focus on distributed systems, PlusCal most resembles an imperative programming language and is better-suited when specifying sequential algorithms. PlusCal was designed to replace pseudocode, retaining its simplicity while providing a formally defined and verifiable language. A one-bit clock is written in PlusCal as follows:

-- fair algorithm OneBitClock {
  variable clock \in {0, 1};
  {
    while (TRUE) {
      if (clock = 0)
        clock := 1
      else 
        clock := 0    
    }
  }
}

== See also ==
- FizzBee
- TLA^{+}
- Pseudocode
