= VerilogCSP =

In integrated circuit design, VerilogCSP is a set of macros added to Verilog HDL to support Communicating Sequential Processes (CSP) channel communications. These macros are intended to be used in designing digital asynchronous circuits. VerilogCSP also describes nonlinear pipelines and high-level channel timing properties, such as forward and backward latencies, minimum cycle time, and slack.
