= Jill Hoare =

English computer scientist (born 1933)

- Born: Jill Pym; 15 October 1933 (age 93)
- Occupations: Computer programmer; software engineer
- Employer: Elliott Brothers
- Known for: ALGOL 60 compiler
- Spouse: Sir Charles Antony Richard Hoare
- Children: 3
- Parent(s): John Pym; Diana Gough

Jill, Lady Hoare (born 15 October 1933) is a British computer programmer and software engineer. She was one of the primary developers on the initial compiler for the ALGOL 60 language, developed for Elliott Brothers in 1963.

== Early life and family ==
Hoare was born Jill Pym on 15 October 1933. She is the daughter of Lieutenant Colonel John Pym and Diana Gough. She married Sir Charles Antony Richard Hoare on 13 January 1962. They remained married until his death in 2026. The couple had three children.

== Career ==
Pym was one of the primary developers on the initial compiler for the ALGOL 60 language, developed for Elliott Brothers in 1963. She worked at Stanford University, California, in 1973. After working on ALGOL, Hoare worked on hospital computer systems for the British National Health Service (NHS) in Oxfordshire.

She was interviewed on her career and experiences of coding and programming work at Stanford University in 1973 and working on hospital systems for NHS Oxfordshire by the Oxford Women in Computing Oral History programme in 2020.
