= Bill Roscoe =

Scottish computer scientist

- Born: Andrew William Roscoe; 1956 (age 69–70); Dundee, Scotland
- Other name: Bill
- Citizenship: United Kingdom
- Education: University College, Oxford
- Known for: Communicating Sequential Processes
- Scientific career
- Fields: Computer science; formal methods
- Workplaces: University of Oxford
- Thesis: A Mathematical Theory of Communicating Processes (1982)
- Doctoral advisor: C. A. R. Hoare
- Doctoral students: G. Mike Reed; Gavin Lowe

Andrew William "Bill" Roscoe is a Scottish computer scientist. He was Head of the Department of Computer Science, University of Oxford from 2003 to 2014, and was a Professor of Computer Science. He was also Fellow of University College, Oxford until 2024.

== Education and career ==
Roscoe was born in Dundee, Scotland. He studied for a degree in mathematics at University College, Oxford, from 1975 to 1978, graduating with the top mark for his year at the university. He went on to work at the Computing Laboratory and received his DPhil in 1982. He was appointed Tutorial Fellow at University College in 1983 and served as Senior Tutor from 1993 to 1997. He was head of the Department of Computer Science during 2003–08 and 2009–14. In 2024, a lecture theatre in the Department of Computer Science was named after Roscoe.

== Research ==
Professor Roscoe works in the area of concurrency theory, in particular the semantic underpinning of Communicating Sequential Processes (CSP) and the associated occam programming language with Sir Tony Hoare. He co-founded Formal Systems (Europe) Limited and worked on the algorithms for the Failures-Divergence Refinement (FDR) tool.
