= Leslie Lamport =

American computer scientist and mathematician (born 1941)

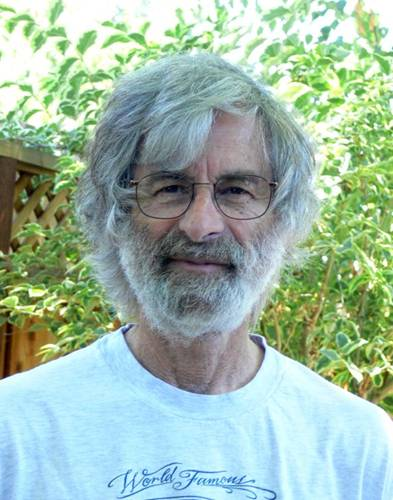
- Lamport in 2008
- Born: February 7, 1941 (age 85); New York City, U.S.
- Education: Massachusetts Institute of Technology (BS); Brandeis University (MA, PhD)
- Known for: LaTeX; Hash chain (S/KEY); Sequential consistency; Lamport's bakery algorithm; Byzantine fault tolerance; Paxos algorithm; Lamport signature; Temporal logic of actions; TLA+
- Awards: Dijkstra Prize (2000, 2005, 2014); IEEE Emanuel R. Piore Award (2004); IEEE John von Neumann Medal (2008); Turing Award (2013); Member of the National Academy of Sciences (2011); ACM Fellow (2014)
- Scientific career
- Fields: Computer science
- Workplaces: Microsoft Research; Compaq; Digital Equipment Corporation; SRI International
- Thesis: The analytic Cauchy problem with singular data (1972)
- Doctoral advisor: Richard Palais
- Website: lamport.azurewebsites.net

Leslie Barry Lamport (born February 7, 1941) is an American computer scientist and mathematician. Lamport is best known for his seminal work in distributed systems, and as the initial developer of the document preparation system LaTeX and the author of its first manual.

Lamport was the winner of the 2013 Turing Award for imposing clear, well-defined coherence on the seemingly chaotic behavior of distributed computing systems, in which several autonomous computers communicate with each other by passing messages. He devised important algorithms and developed formal modeling and verification protocols that improve the quality of real distributed systems. These contributions have resulted in improved correctness, performance, and reliability of computer systems.

== Early life and education ==
Lamport was born into a Jewish family in Brooklyn, New York, the son of Benjamin and Hannah Lamport (née Lasser). His father was an immigrant from Volkovisk in the Russian Empire (now Vawkavysk, Belarus) and his mother was an immigrant from the Austro-Hungarian Empire, now southeastern Poland.

A graduate of Bronx High School of Science, Lamport received a B.S. in mathematics from the Massachusetts Institute of Technology in 1960, followed by M.A. (1963) and Ph.D. (1972) degrees in mathematics from Brandeis University. His dissertation, The analytic Cauchy problem with singular data, is about singularities in analytic partial differential equations.

== Career and research ==
Lamport worked as a computer scientist at Massachusetts Computer Associates from 1970 to 1977, Stanford Research Institute (SRI International) from 1977 to 1985, and Digital Equipment Corporation and Compaq from 1985 to 2001. In 2001 he joined Microsoft Research in California, and he retired in January 2025.

=== Distributed systems ===
Lamport's research contributions have laid the foundations of the theory of distributed systems. Among his most notable papers are

- "Time, Clocks, and the Ordering of Events in a Distributed System", which received the Principles of Distributed Computing (PODC) Influential Paper Award in 2000,
- "How to Make a Multiprocessor Computer That Correctly Executes Multiprocess Programs", which defined the notion of sequential consistency,
- "The Byzantine Generals' Problem",
- "Distributed Snapshots: Determining Global States of a Distributed System" and
- "The Part-Time Parliament".

These papers relate to such concepts as logical clocks (and the happened-before relationship) and Byzantine failures. They are among the most cited papers in the field of computer science, and describe algorithms to solve many fundamental problems in distributed systems, including:

- the Paxos algorithm for consensus,
- the bakery algorithm for mutual exclusion of multiple threads in a computer system that require the same resources at the same time,
- the Chandy–Lamport algorithm for the determination of consistent global states (snapshot), and
- the Lamport signature, one of the prototypes of the digital signature.

=== LaTeX ===
When Donald Knuth began issuing the early releases of TeX in the early 1980s, Lamport – due to his personal need of writing a book – also began working on a set of macros based on it, hoping that it would later become its standard macro package. This set of macros would later become known as LaTeX, for which Lamport would subsequently be approached in 1983 by Peter Gordon, an Addison-Wesley editor, who proposed that Lamport turn its user manual into a book.

In September 1984, Lamport released version 2.06a of the LaTeX macros, and in August 1985, LaTeX 2.09 – the last version of Lamport's LaTeX – would be released as well. Meanwhile, Addison-Wesley released Lamport's first LaTeX user manual, LaTeX: A Document Preparation System, in 1986, which purportedly sold "more than a few hundred thousands" copies, and on August 21, 1989, at a TeX User Group meeting at Stanford, Lamport would agree to turn over the maintenance and development of LaTeX to Frank Mittelbach, who, along with Chris Rowley and Rainer Schöpf, would form the LaTeX3 team, subsequently releasing LaTeX 2e, the current version of LaTeX, in 1994.

=== Temporal logic ===
Lamport is also known for his work on temporal logic, where he introduced the temporal logic of actions (TLA). Among his more recent contributions is TLA^{+}, a language for specifying and reasoning about concurrent and reactive systems, which he describes in the book Specifying Systems: The TLA^{+} Language and Tools for Hardware and Software Engineers. He defines TLA+ as a "quixotic attempt to overcome engineers' antipathy towards mathematics".

== Awards and honors ==
Lamport received the 2013 Turing Award for "fundamental contributions to the theory and practice of distributed and concurrent systems, notably the invention of concepts such as causality and logical clocks, safety and liveness, replicated state machines, and sequential consistency", which can be used in synchronizing the systems. He was elected a member of the National Academy of Engineering in 1991 for contributions to the theoretical foundations of concurrent and fault-tolerant computing. He was elected to Fellow of Association for Computing Machinery for fundamental contributions to the theory and practice of distributed and concurrent systems in 2014. He also received five honorary doctorates from European universities: University of Rennes and Christian Albrechts University of Kiel in 2003, École Polytechnique Fédérale de Lausanne (EPFL) in 2004, University of Lugano in 2006, and Nancy-Université in 2007. In 2004, he received the IEEE Emanuel R. Piore Award. In 2005, the paper "Reaching Agreement in the Presence of Faults" received the Dijkstra Prize. In honor of Lamport's sixtieth birthday, a lecture series was organized at the 20th Symposium on Principles of Distributed Computing (PODC 2001). In 2008, he received the IEEE John von Neumann Medal. In 2011, he was elected to the National Academy of Sciences.

In 2020, the Solana blockchain platform named its smallest unit of currency the lamport in honor of Lamport. The lamport is a fractional native token with the value of 0.000000001 sol (one billionth of a sol).

== See also ==
- List of pioneers in computer science
