= Department of Computer Science, University of Oxford =

Department of the University of Oxford

Department of Computer Science

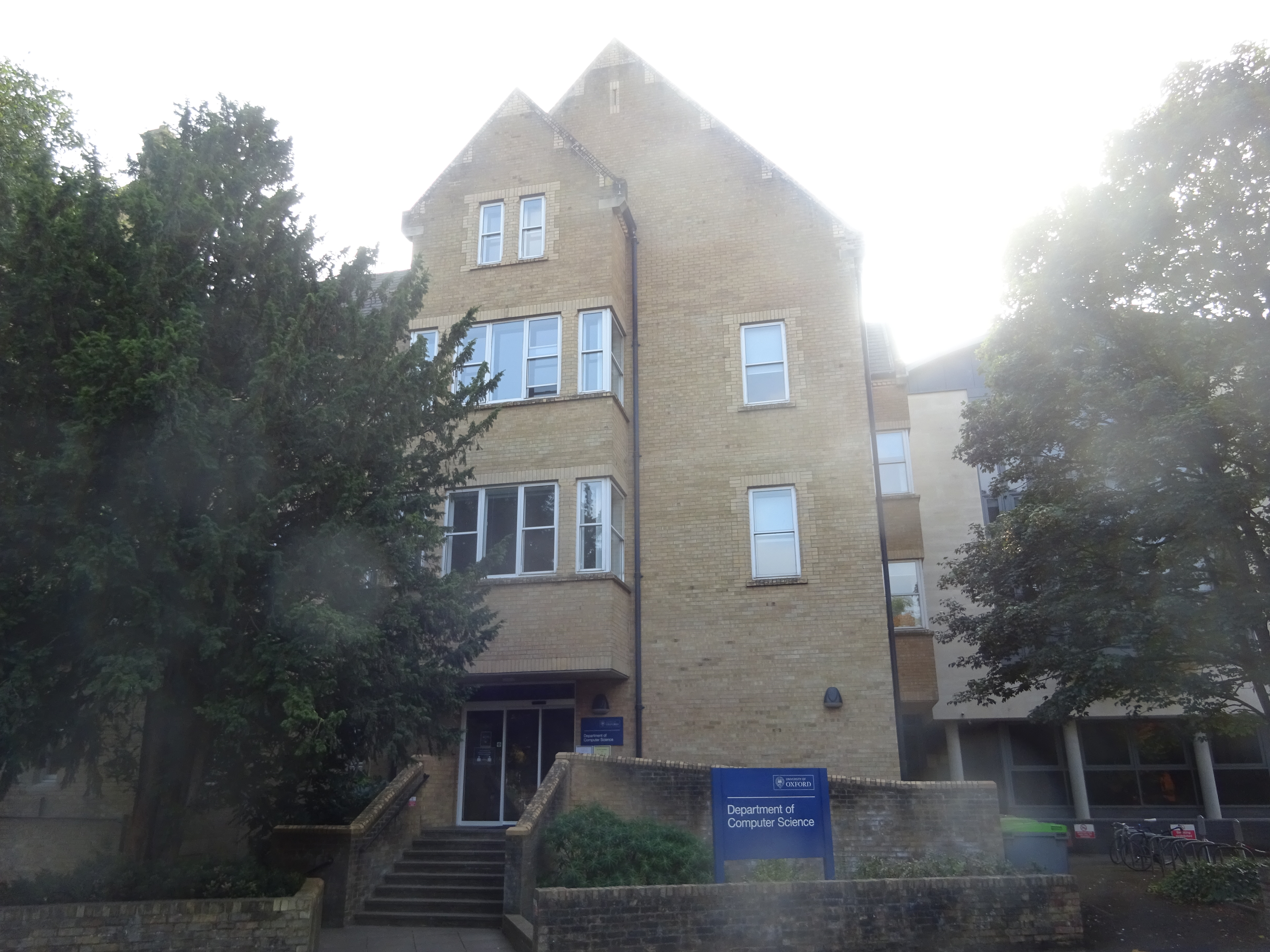
- Wolfson Building; Department of Computer Science
- Former name: Oxford University Computing Laboratory
- Established: 1957
- Research type: Department
- Head of Department: Leslie Ann Goldberg
- Students: 871
- Location: Oxford, United Kingdom; 51.7597°N 1.2584°W
- Operating agency: University of Oxford
- Website: www.cs.ox.ac.uk

Map
- Location within Oxford city centre

The Department of Computer Science is an academic department at the Mathematical, Physical and Life Sciences Division at the University of Oxford in Oxford, England, United Kingdom.

It was founded in 1957 as the Computing Laboratory. By 2014, the staff count was 52 members of academic staff and over 80 research staff. The Times Higher Education World University Rankings placed Oxford University first in the world for Computer Science every year from 2019 to 2026. Oxford University is also the top university for computer science in the United Kingdom and Europe according to Business Insider. The 2026 QS University Subject Rankings places The University of Oxford 4th in the world (with the University of Cambridge placing 8th) for Computer Science, the highest placement of any European university.

== Teaching ==
From its foundation, the department taught undergraduates reading for mathematics and engineering degrees, but in 1985, the department's first undergraduate course was established, in 'Mathematics and Computation', followed in 1994 by the 'Computation' course. Initially, these two courses had a common first year. 'Computer Science' replaced 'Computation' in the title of both courses for students starting their studies in 2000. Between 1987 and 2006, students started studies on a four-year (undergraduate) MEng in Engineering and Computing Science (now discontinued). In October 2012 the first students of the 'Computer Science and Philosophy' course started. In 2026, students on all three undergraduate courses - 'Computer Science', 'Maths & Computer Science' and 'Computer Science & Philosophy' - have the choice between a 3-year BA or a 4-year 'undergraduate masters'. Sixty students began one of the three undergraduate courses in October 2013.

There are two full-time taught postgraduate courses: the MSc in Advanced Computer Science (approx 70 students total) and the MSc in Mathematics and the Foundations of Computer Science (MFoCS) (approx 28 students total).

The department also offers the part-time Software Engineering Programme, a modular course for industry professionals, leading to either the MSc in Software Engineering (approx 240 students at present) or the M.Sc. in Software and Systems Security (approx 45 students at present).

== Research ==
The department is home to around 145 academic and research staff. The department's doctoral programme has over 140 research students (studying for a D.Phil. – the Oxford term for a PhD) working across a wide range of subjects in computer science and software engineering.

After fifty years within the department, the Numerical Analysis group moved in 2009 to be part of the university's Mathematical Institute.

The department's research is classified into ten broad themes:

- Algorithms and Complexity Theory
- Artificial Intelligence and Machine Learning
- Automated Verification
- Computational Biology and Health Informatics
- Data, Knowledge and Action
- Human Centred Computing
- Programming Languages
- Quantum
- Security
- Systems

== Notable faculty ==
As of 2015 the department employed 36 Professors, including:

- Samson Abramsky, Christopher Strachey Professor of Computing (As of 2021, Emeritus)
- Tim Berners-Lee, Professor of Computer Science
- Richard Bird, Emeritus Professor
- Luca Cardelli, Royal Society Research Professor
- Bob Coecke, Professor of Quantum Foundations, Logics and Structures
- Nando de Freitas, Professor of Computer Science
- David Gavaghan, Professor of Computational Biology
- Jeremy Gibbons, Professor of Computing
- Leslie Ann Goldberg, Professor of Computer Science
- Georg Gottlob, Professor of Informatics
- Tony Hoare, Emeritus Professor
- Ian Horrocks, Professor of Computer Science
- Marina Jirotka, Professor of Human Centred Computing
- Daniel Kroening, Professor of Computer Science
- Marta Kwiatkowska, Professor of Computing Systems
- Gavin Lowe, Professor of Computer Science
- Bill Roscoe, Professor of Computing Science
- Nigel Shadbolt, Professor of Computing
- Michael Wooldridge, Professor of Computer Science

== History ==
Starting in 1952, mathematician Charles Coulson sought funding for Oxford to own its own computer. At this time university members had to hire computer time from elsewhere. In 1956, the University Grants Committee decided to fund the purchase of a Ferranti Mercury and the Oxford University Computing Laboratory was born (shortened as OUCL or Comlab). As well as facilitating research elsewhere in the university, the new department had its own academic function, performing research in numerical analysis and lecturing for mathematics and engineering students. The first director, Leslie Fox, was appointed in 1957 and the following year the department moved into its first home, 9 South Parks Road. In 1963 the department moved to 19 Parks Road. The Computing Services (From 2012 part of IT Services) was administratively split from the academic department in 1969, although complete independence was only gained in 1978.

Complementing the Numerical Analysis Group (NAG), the Programming Research Group (PRG) was set up in 1966 at 45 Banbury Road under the leadership of Christopher Strachey with the aim "to bring some coherence into the present ad hoc nature of programming and software". After Strachey's untimely death in 1975, Tony Hoare took over leadership of the PRG in 1977 until his retirement in 1999 and introduced a computer science undergraduate degree programme at Oxford. The NAG and PRG groups operated mostly separately until 1984, when both of the laboratory's research groups moved into 8–11 Keble Road, opposite Keble College. However the laboratory soon outgrew this space, and occupied space in 2 South Parks Road, until in 1993 the Wolfson Building opened behind the Victorian 8–11 Keble Road houses. The neighbouring houses at 5–7 Keble Road and a new "e-Science building" behind these provided additional space upon opening in 2007. However, this space is not sufficient, and the department has additional space within the Thom Building and the Robert Hooke building. As of 2014, the department is hoping to obtain funding for a new building large enough to bring together all its activities.

From 2003 to 2014, the department was led by Bill Roscoe, who oversaw the 2011 renaming from the Oxford University Computing Laboratory to the Department of Computer Science, University of Oxford. In 2021, Professor Leslie Ann Goldberg became the first woman to serve as Head of Department. Professor Ivan Martinovic served as Acting Head of Department from September 2025 to August 2026 whilst Goldberg took a research sabbatical. Professor Leslie Ann Goldberg resumed her role as Head of Department from 1 September 2026.

== See also ==
- Past and present members of the Department
- Oxford University Computing Services
- Programming Research Group
