= Actor model theory =

In theoretical computer science, Actor model theory concerns theoretical issues for the Actor model.

Actors are the primitives that form the basis of the Actor model of concurrent digital computation. In response to a message that it receives, an Actor can make local decisions, create more Actors, send more messages, and designate how to respond to the next message received. Actor model theory incorporates theories of the events and structures of Actor computations, their proof theory, and denotational models.

== Events and their orderings ==
From the definition of an Actor, it can be seen that numerous events take place: local decisions, creating Actors, sending messages, receiving messages, and designating how to respond to the next message received.

However, this article focuses on just those events that are the arrival of a message sent to an Actor.

This article reports on the results published in Hewitt [2006].

Law of Countability: There are at most countably many events.

=== Activation ordering ===
The activation ordering (-≈→) is a fundamental ordering that models one event activating another (there must be energy flow in the message passing from an event to an event which it activates).

- Because of the transmission of energy, the activation ordering is relativistically invariant; that is, for all events e_{1}.e_{2}, if e_{1} -≈→ e_{2}, then the time of e_{1} precedes the time of e_{2} in the relativistic frames of reference of all observers.
- Law of Strict Causality for the Activation Ordering: For no event does e -≈→ e.
- Law of Finite Predecession in the Activation Ordering: For all events e_{1} the set {e|e -≈→ e_{1}} is finite.

=== Arrival orderings ===
The arrival ordering of an Actor x ( -x→ ) models the (total) ordering of events in which a message arrives at x. Arrival ordering is determined by arbitration in processing messages (often making use of a digital circuit called an arbiter). The arrival events of an Actor are on its world line. The arrival ordering means that the Actor model inherently has indeterminacy (see Indeterminacy in concurrent computation).

- Because all of the events of the arrival ordering of an actor x happen on the world line of x, the arrival ordering of an actor is relativistically invariant. I.e., for all actors x and events e_{1}.e_{2}, if e_{1} -x→ e_{2}, then the time of e_{1} precedes the time of e_{2} in the relativistic frames of reference of all observers.
- Law of Finite Predecession in Arrival Orderings: For all events e_{1} and Actors x the set {e|e -x→ e_{1}} is finite.

=== Combined ordering ===
The combined ordering (denoted by →) is defined to be the transitive closure of the activation ordering and the arrival orderings of all Actors.

- The combined ordering is relativistically invariant because it is the transitive closure of relativistically invariant orderings. I.e., for all events e_{1}.e_{2}, if e_{1}→e_{2}. then the time of e_{1} precedes the time of e_{2} in the relativistic frames of reference of all observers.
- Law of Strict Causality for the Combined Ordering: For no event does e→e.

The combined ordering is obviously transitive by definition.

In [Baker and Hewitt 197?], it was conjectured that the above laws might entail the following law:

Law of Finite Chains Between Events in the Combined Ordering: There are no infinite chains (i.e., linearly ordered sets) of events between two events in the combined ordering →.

=== Independence of the Law of Finite Chains Between Events in the Combined Ordering ===
However, [Clinger 1981] surprisingly proved that the Law of Finite Chains Between Events in the Combined Ordering is independent of the previous laws, i.e.,

Theorem. The Law of Finite Chains Between Events in the Combined Ordering does not follow from the previously stated laws.

Proof. It is sufficient to show that there is an Actor computation that satisfies the previously stated laws but violates the Law of Finite Chains Between Events in the Combined Ordering.

Consider a computation which begins when an actor Initial is sent a Start message causing it to take the following actions
1. Create a new actor Greeter_{1} which is sent the message SayHelloTo with the address of Greeter_{1}
2. Send Initial the message Again with the address of Greeter_{1}

Thereafter the behavior of Initial is as follows on receipt of an Again message with address Greeter_{i} (which we will call the event Again_{i}):
1. Create a new actor Greeter_{i+1} which is sent the message SayHelloTo with address Greeter_{i}
2. Send Initial the message Again with the address of Greeter_{i+1}
Obviously the computation of Initial sending itself Again messages never terminates.

The behavior of each Actor Greeter_{i} is as follows:
- When it receives a message SayHelloTo with address Greeter_{i-1} (which we will call the event SayHelloTo_{i}), it sends a Hello message to Greeter_{i-1}
- When it receives a Hello message (which we will call the event Hello_{i}), it does nothing.
Now it is possible that Hello_{i} -Greeter_{i}→ SayHelloTo_{i} every time and therefore Hello_{i}→SayHelloTo_{i}.
Also Again_{i} -≈→ Again_{i+1} every time and therefore Again_{i} → Again_{i+1}.

Furthermore all of the laws stated before the Law of Strict Causality for the Combined Ordering are satisfied.
However, there may be an infinite number of events in the combined ordering between Again_{1} and SayHelloTo_{1} as follows:
Again_{1}→...→Again_{i}→...$\infty$...→Hello_{i}→SayHelloTo_{i}→...→Hello_{1}→SayHelloTo_{1}

However, we know from physics that infinite energy cannot be expended along a finite trajectory. Therefore, since the Actor model is based on physics, the Law of Finite Chains Between Events in the Combined Ordering was taken as an axiom of the Actor model.

=== Law of Discreteness ===
The Law of Finite Chains Between Events in the Combined Ordering is closely related to the following law:

Law of Discreteness: For all events e_{1} and e_{2}, the set {e|e_{1}→e→e_{2}} is finite.

In fact the previous two laws have been shown to be equivalent:

Theorem [Clinger 1981]. The Law of Discreteness is equivalent to the Law of Finite Chains Between Events in the Combined Ordering (without using the axiom of choice.)

The law of discreteness rules out Zeno machines and is related to results on Petri nets [Best et al. 1984, 1987].

The Law of Discreteness implies the property of unbounded nondeterminism. The combined ordering is used by [Clinger 1981] in the construction of a denotational model of Actors (see denotational semantics).

== Denotational semantics ==
Clinger [1981] used the Actor event model described above to construct a denotational model for Actors using power domains. Subsequently, Hewitt [2006] augmented the diagrams with arrival times to construct a technically simpler denotational model that is easier to understand.

== See also ==
- Actor model early history
- Actor model and process calculi
- Actor model implementation
