= Axum (programming language) =

Domain specific concurrent programming language originally developed by Microsoft

- Developer: Microsoft
- First appeared: May 8, 2009
- Stable release: Community Technology Preview / May 8, 2009
- Platform: x86, x86-64 and Itanium
- OS: Windows XP; Windows Server 2003; Windows Vista; Windows Server 2008; Windows 7
- License: Closed source
- Website: Axum at DevLabs

Axum (previously codenamed Maestro) is a domain-specific concurrent programming language, based on the Actor model, that was under active development by Microsoft between 2009 and 2011. It is an object-oriented language based on the .NET Common Language Runtime using a C-like syntax which, being a domain-specific language, is intended for development of portions of a software application that is well-suited to concurrency. But it contains enough general-purpose constructs that one need not switch to a general-purpose programming language (like C#) for the sequential parts of the concurrent components.

The main idiom of programming in Axum is an Agent (or an Actor), which is an isolated entity that executes in parallel with other Agents. In Axum parlance, this is referred to as the agents executing in separate isolation domains; objects instantiated within a domain cannot be directly accessed from another. Agents are loosely coupled (i.e., the number of dependencies between agents is minimal) and do not share resources like memory (unlike the shared memory model of C# and similar languages); instead a message passing model is used. To co-ordinate agents or having an agent request the resources of another, an explicit message must be sent to the agent. Axum provides Channels to facilitate this.

Channels can be regarded as a directional pathway to communicate between agent instances. The member functions of a Channel object, after it has been bound to an agent instance, can be used to communicate with it. A Channel contains input and output ports, which are queues which are used to send data to an agent or receive data from one. To co-ordinate the communication between agents, Axum allows each channel to have a user-defined protocol for communication. The protocol is defined as a state machine. The data sent over a channel can be optionally restricted to conform to a certain pre-defined schema. The compiler and runtime will enforce the conformance with the schema. Under the hood, a schema is translated into a serializable .NET class that contains only properties and side effect-free methods.

The Axum project reached the state of a prototype with working Microsoft Visual Studio integration. Microsoft had made a CTP of Axum available to the public, but this has since been removed. Although Microsoft decided not to turn Axum into a project, some of the ideas behind Axum are used in TPL Dataflow in .Net 4.5.
