= Actor model implementation =

In computer science

In computer science, actor model implementation concerns implementation issues for the actor model.

== Cosmic Cube ==
The Caltech Cosmic Cube was developed by Chuck Seitz et al. at Caltech providing architectural support for actor systems. A significant difference between the Cosmic Cube and most other parallel processors is that this multiple instruction, multiple data (MIMD) machine uses message passing, rather than shared variables, for communication between concurrent processes. This computational model is reflected in the hardware structure and operating system, and is also the explicit message passing communication seen by the programmer. According to Seitz [1985]:

It was a premise of the Cosmic Cube experiment that the internode communication should scale well to very large numbers of nodes. A direct network like the hypercube satisfies this requirement, with respect to both the aggregate bandwidth achieved across the many concurrent communication channels and the feasibility of the implementation. The hypercube is actually a distributed variant of an indirect logarithmic switching network like the Omega or banyan networks: in shared-storage organizations, uniform communication paths are typically used. However, with the hypercube architecture, communication paths can traverse varying numbers of channels, resulting in different latencies. This makes it possible to optimize performance by placing processes in nodes based on communication locality.

== J–Machine ==
The J–Machine was developed by Bill Dally et al. at MIT providing architectural support suitable for actors. This included the following:

- Asynchronous messaging
- A uniform space of actor addresses to which messages could be sent concurrently regardless of whether the recipient actor was local or nonlocal
- A form of actor pipelining (see actor model)

Concurrent Smalltalk (which can be modeled using actors) was developed to program the J Machine.

== Prototype actor programming language ==
Hewitt [2006] presented a prototype actor programming language in the sense that it directly expresses important aspects of the behavior of actors. Messages are expressed in XML using the notation :<tag>[<element>_{1} ... <element>] for

“<”<tag>“>” <element>_{1} ... <element>_{n} “<”/<tag>“>”

The semantics of the programming language are defined by representing each program construct as an actor with its own behavior. Execution is modeled through the passing of Eval messages among these constructs during runtime.

=== Environment actors ===
Each Eval message has the address of an actor that acts as an environment with the bindings of program identifiers. Environment actors are immutable, i.e., they do not change. When Request[Bind[identifier value] customer] is received by an actor environment, a new environment actor is created such that when the new environment actor receives Request[Lookup[identifier’] customer’] then if identifier is the same as identifier’ send customer’ Returned[value], else send Environment Request[Lookup[identifier’] customer’]. The above builds on an actor EmptyEnvironment which when it receives Request[Lookup[identifier] customer], sends customer Thrown[NotFound[identifier]]. When it receives a Bind request EmptyEnvironment acts like Environment above.

=== Expressions ===
The prototype programming language has expressions of the following kinds:

<identifier>
When Request[Eval[environment] customer] is received, send environment Request[Lookup[<identifier>] customer]

send <recipient> <communication>
When Request[Eval[environment] customer] is received, send <recipient> Request[Eval[environment] evalCustomer_{1}] where evalCustomer_{1} is a new actor such that
when evalCustomer_{1} receives the communication Returned[theRecipient], then send <communication>
Request[Eval[environment] evalCustomer_{2}] where evalCustomer_{2} is a new actor such that
when evalCustomer_{2} receives the communication Returned[theCommunication], then send theRecipient theCommunication.

<recipient>.<message>
When Request[Eval[environment] customer] is received, send <recipient> Request[Eval[environment] evalCustomer_{1}] such that
when evalCustomer_{1} receives the communication Returned[theRecipient], then send <message> Request[Eval[environment] evalCustomer_{2}] such that
when evalCustomer_{2} receives the communication Returned[theMessage], then send theRecipient
Request[theMessage customer]

receiver ... <pattern>_{i} <expression>_{i} ...
When Request[Eval[environment] customer] is received, send customer a new actor theReceiver such that
when theReceiver receives a communication com, then create a new bindingCustomer and send environment
Request[Bind[<pattern>_{i} com] bindingCustomer] and
if bindingCustomer receives Returned[environment’], send <expression>_{i}
Request[Eval[environment’]]
otherwise if bindingCustomer receives Thrown[...], try <pattern>_{i+1}

behavior ... <pattern>_{i} <expression>_{i} ...
When Request[Eval[environment] customer] is received, send customer a new actor theReceiver such that
when theReceiver receives Request[message customer’], then create a new bindingCustomer and send environment
Request[bind[<pattern>_{i} message] customer’] and
1. if bindingCustomer receives Returned[environment’], send <expression>_{i}
  Request[Eval[environment’] customer’]
2. otherwise if bindingCustomer receives Thrown[...], try <pattern>_{i+1}

{<expression>_{1}, <expression>_{2}}
When Request[Eval[environment] customer] is received, send <expression>_{1} Request[Eval[environment]] and concurrently send <expression>_{2} Request[Eval[environment]] customer].

let <identifier> = <expression>_{value} in <expression>_{body}
When message[Eval[environment] customer] is received, then create a new evalCustomer and send <expression>_{value}
Request[Eval[environment] evalCustomer_{1}.
When evalCustomer receives Returned[theValue], create a new bindingCustomer and send environment
Request[bind[<identifier> theValue] bindingCustomer]
When bindingCustomer receives Returned[environment’], send <expression>_{body} Request[Eval[environment’] customer]

serializer <expression>
When Request[Eval[environment] customer] is received, then send customer Returned[theSerializer] where theSerializer is a new actor such that communications sent to theSerializer are processed in FIFO order with a behavior actor that is initially <expression>.Eval[environment] and
When communication com is received by theSerializer, then send the behavior actor Request[com customer’] where customer’ is a new actor such that
when customer’ receives Returned[theNextBehavior] then theNextBehavior is used as the behavior actor for the next communication received by theSerializer.

=== Example program ===
An example program for a simple storage cell that can contain any actor address is as follows:

Cell ≡

receiver

Request[Create[initial] customer]

send customer Returned[serializer ReadWrite(initial)]

The above program which creates a storage cell makes use of the behavior ReadWrite which is defined as follows:

ReadWrite(contents) ≡

behavior

Request[read[] customer]

{send customer Returned[contents], ReadWrite(contents)}

Request[write[x] customer]

{send customer Returned[], ReadWrite(x)}

The above behavior is pipelined, i.e., the behavior might still be processing a previous read or write message while it is processing a subsequent read or write message.. For example, the following expression creates a cell x with initial contents 5 and then concurrently writes to it with the values 7 and 9.

let x = Cell.Create[5] in {x.write[7], x.write[9], x.read[]}

The value of the above expression is 5, 7 or 9.

== See also ==
- actor model and process calculi
- actor model theory
