= Buridan's ass =

Philosophical paradox regarding free will

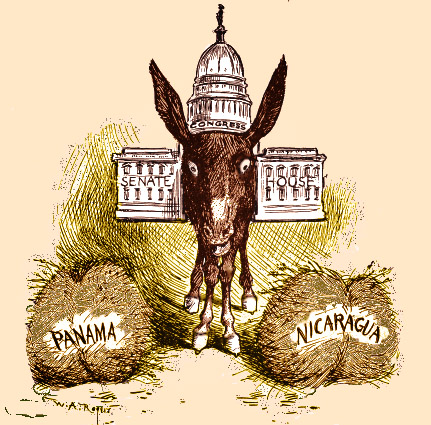
Political cartoon c. 1900, showing the United States Congress as Buridan's ass (in the two hay piles version), hesitating between a Panama route or a Nicaragua route for an Atlantic–Pacific canal

Buridan's ass is an illustration of a paradox in philosophy in the conception of free will. It refers to a hypothetical situation wherein an ass (or donkey) that is equally hungry and thirsty is placed precisely midway between a stack of hay and a pail of water. Since the paradox assumes the ass will always go to whichever is closer, it dies of both hunger and thirst since it cannot make any rational decision between the hay and water. A common variant of the paradox substitutes the hay and water for two identical piles of hay; the ass, unable to choose between the two, dies of hunger.

The paradox is named after the 14th-century French philosopher Jean Buridan, whose philosophy of moral determinism it satirizes. Although the illustration is named after Buridan, philosophers have discussed the concept before him, notably Aristotle, who put forward the example of a man equally hungry and thirsty, and Al-Ghazali, who used a man faced with the choice of equally good dates.

A version of this situation appears as metastability in digital electronics, when an electric circuit must decide between two states based on an input that is in itself undefined (neither zero nor one). Metastability becomes a problem if the circuit spends more time than it should in this "undecided" state, which is usually set by the speed of the clock the system is using.

== History ==
The paradox is found in Aristotle's On the Heavens. Aristotle, in ridiculing Anaximander's idea that the Earth is stationary simply because it is spherical and any forces on it must be equal in all directions, says that is as ridiculous as saying that

... a man, being just as hungry as thirsty, and placed in between food and drink, must necessarily remain where he is and starve to death.

— Aristotle, On the Heavens 295b, c. 350 BC

However, the Greeks only used this paradox as an analogy in the context of the equilibrium of physical forces. The 12th-century Persian scholar and philosopher Al-Ghazali discusses the application of this paradox to human decision making, asking whether it is possible to make a choice between equally good courses without grounds for preference. He takes the attitude that free will can break the stalemate.

Suppose two similar dates in front of a man, who has a strong desire for them but who is unable to take them both. Surely he will take one of them, through a quality in him, the nature of which is to differentiate between two similar things.

— Abu Hamid al-Ghazali, The Incoherence of the Philosophers, c. 1100

Andalusian philosopher Averroes (1126–1198), in commentary on Ghazali, takes the opposite view.

Although Buridan nowhere discusses this specific problem, its relevance is that he did advocate a moral determinism whereby, save for ignorance or impediment, a human faced by alternative courses of action must always choose the greater good. In the face of equally good alternatives Buridan believed a rational choice could not be made.

Should two courses be judged equal, then the will cannot break the deadlock, all it can do is to suspend judgement until the circumstances change, and the right course of action is clear.

— Jean Buridan, c. 1340

Later writers satirised this view in terms of an ass which, confronted by both food and water, must necessarily die of both hunger and thirst while pondering a decision.

Many later philosophers have addressed this problem of "choice without preference". In his Ethics (c. 1661), Baruch de Spinoza accepts that his determinist philosophy implies that such a state of indecision could happen, but that this should be classed with other irrational behavior:

[I]t may be objected, if man does not act from free will, what will happen if the incentives to action are equally balanced, as in the case of Buridan's ass? [In reply,] I am quite ready to admit, that a man placed in the equilibrium described (namely, as perceiving nothing but hunger and thirst, a certain food and a certain drink, each equally distant from him) would die of hunger and thirst. If I am asked, whether such a one should not rather be considered an ass than a man; I answer, that I do not know, neither do I know how a man should be considered, who hangs himself, or how we should consider children, fools, madmen, &c.

— Baruch Spinoza, Ethics, book 2, proposition 49, scholium

Pierre Bayle (1647–1706) in his Dictionnaire authored some of the most comprehensive discussions of the problem. He recognized explicitly that if humans have the ability to make a decision between choices with no reason for preference, this means that humans have free will, and bears on man's rationalization of God's choices. He regarded the previous examples of the ass or dates as artificial, and pointed out there are many real instances in everyday life in which a person must make a choice in which the choice doesn't matter to him, and that this presents no problem.

Gottfried Wilhelm Leibniz (1646–1716) believed, from his principle of sufficient reason, that if a person's preferences were really balanced no decision could be made, but that petites perceptions, small perceived preferences below the threshold of consciousness that are always present, explain why people are able to make such a choice.

== Discussion ==
Some proponents of hard determinism such as Spinoza have granted the unpleasantness of the scenario, but have denied that it illustrates a true paradox, since one does not contradict oneself in suggesting that a man might die between two equally plausible routes of action.

Other writers have opted to deny the validity of the illustration. A typical counter-argument is that rationality as described in the paradox is so limited as to be a straw man version of the real thing, which does allow the consideration of meta-arguments. In other words, it is entirely rational to recognize that both choices are equally good and arbitrarily (randomly) pick one instead of starving; although the decision that they are sufficiently the same is also subject to Buridan's ass. The idea that a random decision could be made is sometimes used as an attempted justification for faith or intuitivity (called by Aristotle noetic or noesis). The argument is that, like the starving ass, we must make a choice to avoid being frozen in endless doubt. Other counter-arguments exist.

According to Edward Lauzinger, Buridan's ass fails to incorporate the latent biases that humans always bring with them when making decisions.

Social psychologist Kurt Lewin's field theory treated this paradox experimentally. He demonstrated that lab rats experience difficulty when choosing between two equally attractive (approach–approach) goals. The typical response to approach–approach decisions is initial ambivalence, though the decision becomes more decisive as the organism moves towards one choice and away from another.

== Buridan's principle ==
The situation of Buridan's ass was given a mathematical basis in a 1984 paper by American computer scientist Leslie Lamport, in which Lamport presents an argument that, given certain assumptions about continuity in a simple mathematical model of the Buridan's ass problem, there is always some starting condition under which the ass starves to death, no matter what strategy it takes. He further illustrates the paradox with the example of a driver stopped at a railroad crossing trying to decide whether he has time to cross before a train arrives. He proves that regardless of how "safe" the policy the driver adopts, because indecision can cause an indefinite delay in action, a small percentage of drivers will be hit by the train.

Lamport calls this result "Buridan’s principle":

A discrete decision based upon an input having a continuous range of values cannot be made within a bounded length of time.

He points out that just because we do not see asses or people starving to death through indecision, or other examples of Buridan's undecided states in real life, does not disprove the principle. The persistence of a Buridan's undecided state for a perceptible length of time may just be sufficiently improbable that it has not been observed.

== Application to digital logic: metastability ==
A version of Buridan's principle occurs in electrical engineering. Specifically, the input to a digital logic gate must convert a continuous voltage value into either a 0 or a 1, which is typically sampled and then processed. If the input is changing and at an intermediate value when sampled, the input stage acts like a comparator. The voltage value can then be likened to the position of the ass, and the values 0 and 1 represent the bales of hay. As in the situation of the starving ass, there exists an input on which the converter cannot make a proper decision, and the output remains balanced in a metastable state between the two stable states for an undetermined length of time, until random noise in the circuit makes it converge to one of the stable states.

The metastability problem is a significant issue in digital circuit design, and metastable states are a possibility wherever asynchronous inputs (digital signals not synchronized to a clock signal) occur. The ultimate reason the problem is manageable is that the probability of a metastable state persisting longer than a given time interval t is an exponentially declining function of t. In electronic devices, the probability of such an "undecided" state lasting longer than a matter of nanoseconds, while always possible, can be made negligibly low.

In asynchronous system design, arbiter circuits have been developed to make such decisions. They can reduce to insignificance the probability that a metastable state occurs, at the cost of increased decision time.

== See also ==
- Axiom of choice
- Analysis paralysis
- Catch-22
- Dining philosophers problem
- Fredkin's paradox
- Hobson's choice
- Lagrangian point
- Morton's fork
- Norton's dome
- Principle of sufficient reason § Leibniz's view
- Search cost
- Spontaneous symmetry breaking
- Velleity
- Golden Mean

== Bibliography ==
- The Columbia Encyclopedia (6th ed.). 2006.
- Knowles, Elizabeth (2006). The Oxford Dictionary of Phrase and Fable.
- Mawson, T.J. (2005). Belief in God. New York, NY: Oxford University (Clarendon) Press. p. 201.
- Rescher, Nicholas (1959). "Choice Without Preference: A Study of the History and of the Logic of the Problem of 'Buridan's Ass'". Kant-Studien. 51 (1–4): 142–75. doi:10.1515/kant.1960.51.1-4.142. S2CID 171037127.
- Zupko, Jack (2003). John Buridan: Portrait of a Fourteenth-Century Arts Master. Notre Dame, Indiana: University of Notre Dame Press. pp. 258, 400n71.
- Ullmann-Margalit, E.; Morgenbesser, S. (1977). "Picking and Choos-ing". Social Research. 44: 757–785.
