= Timeline of web search engines =

This page provides a full timeline of web search engines, starting from the WHOis in 1982, the Archie search engine in 1990, and subsequent developments in the field. It is complementary to the history of web search engines page that provides more qualitative detail on the history.

== Timeline ==
Year	Month	Day	Event type	Event
1982			Pre-web domain search engine	WHOis Elizabeth Feinler and her team (who had created the Resource Directory for ARPANET) were responsible for creating the first WHOIS directory in the early 1970s. Feinler set up a server in Stanford's Network Information Center (NIC) which acted as a directory that could retrieve relevant information about people or entities. She and the team created domains, with Feinler's suggestion that domains be divided into categories based on the physical address of the computer.
1990	September	10 (released)	Pre-web content search engine	The Archie search engine, created by Alan Emtage computer science student at McGill University in Montreal, goes live. The program downloads the directory listings of all the files located on public anonymous FTP (File Transfer Protocol) sites, creates a searchable database of a lot of file names; however, Archie does not index the contents of these sites since the amount of data is so limited it can be readily searched manually.
1991			Pre-web search engine	The rise of Gopher (created in 1991 by Mark McCahill at the University of Minnesota) leads to two new search programs, Veronica and Jughead. Like Archie, they search the file names and titles stored in Gopher index systems. Veronica (Very Easy Rodent-Oriented Net-wide Index to Computerized Archives) provides a keyword search of most Gopher menu titles in the entire Gopher listings. Jughead (Jonzy's Universal Gopher Hierarchy Excavation And Display) is a tool for obtaining menu information from specific Gopher servers. While the name of the search engine "Archie" was not a reference to the Archie comic book series, "Veronica" and "Jughead" are characters in the series, thus referencing their predecessor.
1992			Virtual library of the web	Tim Berners-Lee sets up the Virtual Library (VLib), a loose confederation of topical experts maintaining relevant topical link lists.
1993	June		First web robot	Matthew K. Gray produces the first known web robot, the Perl-based World Wide Web Wanderer, and uses it to generate an index of the web called the Wandex. However, the World Wide Web Wanderer is intended only to measure the size of the web rather than to facilitate search.
1993	September	2	First web search engine	W3Catalog, written by Oscar Nierstrasz at the University of Geneva, is released to the world. It is the world's first web search engine. It does not rely on a crawler and indexer but rather on already existing high-quality lists of websites. One of its main drawbacks is that the bot accesses each page hundreds of times each day, causing performance degradation.
1993	October/November		Second web search engine	Aliweb, a web search engine created by Martijn Koster, is announced. It does not use a web robot, but instead depends on being notified by website administrators of the existence at each site of an index file in a particular format. The absence of a bot means that less bandwidth is used; however, most website administrators are not aware of the need to submit their data.
1993	December		First web search engine to use a crawler and indexer	JumpStation, created by Jonathon Fletcher, is released. It is the first WWW resource-discovery tool to combine the three essential features of a web search engine (crawling, indexing, and searching).
1994	January		New web directory	Yahoo!, founded by Jerry Yang and David Filo, launches Yahoo! Directory. It becomes the first popular Web directory.
1994	January		New web search engine	Infoseek is launched.
1994	March		New web search engine	The World-Wide Web Worm is released. It is claimed to have been created in September 1993, at which time there did not exist any crawler-based search engine, but it is not the earliest at the time of its actual release. It supports Perl-based regular expressions.
1994	April	20	New web search engine	The WebCrawler search engine, created by Brian Pinkerton at the University of Washington, is released. Unlike its predecessors, it allows users to search for any word in any webpage, which has become the standard for all major search engines since.
1994	July		New web search engine	Lycos, a web search engine, is released. It began as a research project by Michael Loren Mauldin of Carnegie Mellon University's main Pittsburgh campus.
1995			New search engine	Yahoo! Search is launched. It is a search function that allows users to search Yahoo! Directory. It becomes the first popular search engine on the Web. However, it is not a true Web crawler search engine.
1995			New search engine	Search.ch is launched. It is a search engine and web portal for Switzerland.
1995			New web directory	LookSmart is released. It competes with Yahoo! as a web directory, and the competition makes both directories more inclusive.
1995	December		Web search engine supporting natural language queries	Altavista is launched. This is a first among web search engines in many ways: it has unlimited bandwidth, allows natural language queries, has search tips, and allows people to add or delete their domains in 24 hours.
1996			New web search engine	Robin Li developed the RankDex site-scoring algorithm for search engines results page ranking and received a US patent for the technology. It was the first search engine that used hyperlinks to measure the quality of websites it was indexing, predating the very similar algorithm patent filed by Google two years later in 1998. Larry Page referenced Li's work as a citation in some of his U.S. patents for PageRank. Li later used his Rankdex technology for the Baidu search engine.
1996	January–March		New web search engine	Larry Page and Sergey Brin begin working on BackRub, the predecessor to Google Search. The crawler begins activity in March.
1996	May		New web search engine	Inktomi releases its HotBot search engine.
1996	October		New web search engine	Gary Culliss and Steven Yang begin work at MIT on the popularity engine, a version of the Direct Hit Technologies search engine that ranks results across users according to the selections made during previous searches.
1997	April		New natural language-based web search engine	Ask Jeeves, a natural language web search engine, that aims to rank links by popularity, is released. It would later become Ask.com.
1997	September	15	New web search engine	The domain Google.com is registered. Soon, Google Search is available to the public from this domain (around 1998).
1997	September	23	New web search engine (non-English)	Arkady Volozh and Ilya Segalovich launch their Russian web search engine Yandex and publicly present it at the Softool exhibition in Moscow. The initial development is by Comptek; Yandex would become a separate company in 2000.
1998	June	5	New web directory	Gnuhoo, a web directory project by Rich Skrenta and Bob Truel, both employees of Sun Microsystems, launches. It would later be renamed the Open Directory Project.
1998	July–September		New web search portal	MSN launches a search portal called MSN Search, using search results from Inktomi. After many changes to the backend search engine, MSN would start developing in-house search technology in 2005, and later change its name to Bing in June 2009.
1998	August		New web search engine	Direct Hit Technologies releases their popularity search engine in partnership with HotBot, providing more relevant results based on prior user search activity.
1999	May		New web search engine	AlltheWeb, based on the Ph.D. thesis of Tor Egge at the Norwegian University of Science and Technology, titled FTP Search, launches. The engine is launched by Egge's company Fast Search & Transfer, established on July 16, 1997.
2000	January	1	New web search portal	Baidu, a Chinese company that would grow to provide many search-related services, launches. It was founded by Robin Li, who previously developed RankDex in 1996.
2002–03			Web search business consolidation	Yahoo! buys Inktomi (2002) and then Overture Services Inc. (2003) which has already bought AlltheWeb and Altavista. Starting 2003, Yahoo! starts using its own Yahoo Slurp web crawler to power Yahoo! Search. Yahoo! Search combines the technologies of all Yahoo!'s acquisitions (until 2002, Yahoo! had been using Google to power its search).
2004–05	November (2004) – February (2005)		Change in backend providers	Microsoft starts using its own indexer and crawler for MSN Search rather than using blended results from LookSmart and Inktomi.
2004	December		User experience	Google Suggest is introduced as a Google Labs feature.
2005	January		Webmaster tools	To combat link spam, Google, Yahoo! and Microsoft collectively introduce the nofollow attribute.
2005	October		New web search engine	Overture Services Inc. owner Bill Gross launches the Snap search engine, with many features such as display of search volumes and other information, as well as sophisticated auto-completion and related terms display. It is unable to get traction and soon goes out of business.
2006	December	23 (proposed)	New human-curated web search engine	Wikia Search (Wikia), a search engine based on human curation.
2007	January	31 (re-proposed)	New human-curated web search engine	Wikia Search
2008	January	28	New web search engine	Cuil, a web search engine created by ex-Googlers that uses picture thumbnails to display search results, launches. It would later shut down on September 17, 2010.
2008	September	25	New web search engine	DuckDuckGo (DDG), a web search engine focused on protecting searchers' privacy by not profiling its users, launches.
2009	March–May	14	Web search EOL	shutdown of Wikia Search
2009	July	29	Web search engine consolidation	Microsoft and Yahoo! announce that they have made a ten-year deal in which the Yahoo! search engine would be replaced by Bing. Yahoo! will get to keep 88% of the revenue from all search ad sales on its site for the first five years of the deal, and have the right to sell adverts on some Microsoft sites. Yahoo! Search will still maintain its own user interface, but will eventually feature "Powered by Bing™" branding.
2009	August	10 (announced)	Search algorithm update	Named Caffeine, it promises faster crawling, expansion of the index, and a near-real-time integration of indexing and ranking.
2009	September	1	New web search engine	The search engine ImHalal is launched built on top of social-cultural Islamic values.
2009	December	7	New web search engine	The search engine Ecosia is launched.
2010	June	8	Search algorithm update	Caffeine rollout completed and made live
2010	September	8	User experience	Google launches Google Instant, described as a search-before-you-type feature: as users are typing, Google predicts the user's whole search query (using the same technology as in Google Suggest, later called the autocomplete feature) and instantaneously shows results for the top prediction. Google claims that this is estimated to save 2–5 seconds per search query. SEO commentators initially believe that this will have a major effect on search engine optimization, but soon revise downward their estimate of the impact.
2010	November	1	New web search engine	Blekko, a search engine that uses slashtags to allow people to search in more targeted categories, launches.
2011	February	23–24	Search algorithm update	Google launches Google Panda, a major update affecting 12% of search queries. The update continues with the earlier work of cracking down on spam, content farms, scrapers, and websites with a high ad-to-content ratio. The rollout is gradual over several months, and Panda will see many further updates.
2011	June	2	Webmaster tools	Google, Yahoo!, and Microsoft announce Schema.org, a joint initiative that supports a richer range of tags that websites can use to convey better information.
2012	January	10	Search algorithm update, user experience	Google launches Search Plus Your World, a deep integration of one's social data into search. SEO commentators are critical of how the search results favor Google+ and push it to users, compared to more widely used social networks such as Facebook and Twitter.
2012	April	24	Search algorithm update	Google launches its "Webspam update" which would soon become known as Google Penguin.
2012	May	10	User experience	Microsoft announces a redesign of its Bing search engine that includes "Sidebar", a social feature that searches users' social networks for information relevant to the search query.
2012	May	16	Search algorithm update	Google starts rolling out Knowledge Graph, used by Google internally to store semantic relationships between objects. Google now begins displaying supplemental information about objects related to search queries on the side.
2013	April	13	New web search engine	Pipilika, first Bangla search engine, launched.
2013	July	4	New web search engine	French search engine Qwant launched and operated from Paris. It claims that it does not employ user tracking or personalize search results in order to avoid trapping users in a filter bubble. The search engine is available in 26 languages.
2013	September	26	Search algorithm update	Google releases Google Hummingbird, a core algorithm update that may enable a more semantic search and more effective use of the Knowledge Graph in the future.
2014	January	22	New web search engine	Searx, a free and open-source metasearch engine, is launched. Searx puts an emphasis on privacy.
2014	July	24	Search algorithm update	Google introduces Google Pigeon, with the goal of increasing the ranking of local listings in a search.
2021	June	21	New web search engine	Brave Software, Inc., the developer of the Brave web browser, launches their own search engine, called Brave Search.
2024	July	26	New web search engine	OpenAI launches SearchGPT, a prototype search engine that combines traditional search engine features with generative AI capabilities. SearchGPT's architecture is built on the principles of transformer models, which use self-attention mechanisms to process and generate text.

== See also ==
- Timeline of Google Search
