= MIT $100K Entrepreneurship Competition =

Student-managed business plan competition

The MIT $100K Entrepreneurship Competition is a student-managed business plan competition, where undergraduates and postgraduates from various programs and all levels at the Massachusetts Institute of Technology (MIT) organize and enter the competition. Teams must include at least one full-time MIT student, but membership is not limited to the MIT community. The competition is supported by the MIT Entrepreneurship Center at the MIT Sloan School of Management. Every year a total of $300,000 is distributed as non-dilutive grant money. Since 1990, over 160 companies have been started as a result of the competition, generating 4,600 jobs, receiving over $1.3 billion in follow-up venture capital funding and totaling a cumulative market value of over $15 billion.

== Process ==
Throughout the academic year, the teams take part in a process that includes industry and legal mentorship, multiple live judging rounds, prototyping and pitch workshops, expense accounts for venture development, networking events with sponsors and alumni, and the awarding of roughly US$300,000 in non-dilutive prize money.

The competition started in 1990 as the $10K competition and continued to grow throughout the 1990s. In 1996 the $10K evolved into the $50K, with $30K going to the winner and $10K to each of the two runners-up. In 2006, the $50K grant competition also added another aspect to the competition focused on business plans for low-income communities to complement the traditional business venture competition. Subsequently, the competition has rebranded itself with a larger grant amount of $100K and is called the MIT $100K Pitch Contest.

== MIT $100K PITCH Contest ==
The MIT $100K Pitch Contest is organized yearly by the MIT $100K organizing committee. Intended to provide a way for entrepreneurs with ideas to form teams, it is held in the fall. The contest is a warm-up event for the Executive Summary Contest, held in the winter, and the Business Plan Contest, held in the spring. In the Elevator Pitch Contest, each contestant is given 60 seconds in front of a crowd to give their "elevator pitch," with the winner receiving a cash prize. This contest is open to the public.

== MIT $100K ACCELERATE Contest ==
The MIT $100K ACCELERATE Contest replaced the MIT $100K Executive Summary Contest in 2011. It is held in the winter of the academic year and is intended to help teams build a robust prototype for their start-up idea. Teams work on creating a demonstration of their idea over December and January, and the best selected are the ACCELERATE Finale Show. MIT $100K provides resources and mentorship to help teams build their demonstrations, which will be reviewed by a panel of judges, with the winner receiving a cash prize.

== MIT $100K LAUNCH - Business Plan Contest ==
The MIT $100K Launch Contest is the flagship of the MIT $100K Entrepreneurship Competition. In the spring, semi-finalists are selected from all business plan submissions. LAUNCH is the final contest in the $100K cycle. Participants present full-scale business plans for the chance to win a $100,000 grand prize.

=== Winners - Business Plan Contest ===
Year	Winner	Track and Description	Team Members
2025	CoFlo Medical	Medical Devices	Simon Rufer, Vishnu Jayaprakash, Kripa K. Varanasi
2024	Helix Carbon	Cleantech, Sustainability, Hardware	Evan Haas
2023	Active Surfaces	Cleantech, Sustainability, Hardware	Shiv Bhakta, Richard Swartwout
2022	Nona+ Desalination	Cleantech, Sustainability, Hardware	Junghyo Yoon, Bruce Crawford
2021	Osmoses	Cleantech, Energy Efficiency	Francesco Maria Benedetti, Katherine Mizrahi Rodriguez, Holden Lai
2020	Ocular Technologies	Hardware, Health & Wellness	Brett Sternfield, Zona Liu, Grayson Armstrong
2019	Amplified industries	Artificial Intelligence, IoT	Sebastien Mannai, Charles-Henri Clerget, Louis Creteur
2018	Infinite Cooling	n/a	Maher Damak, Karim Khalil
2017	Lightmatter	Artificial Intelligence, Machine Learning, Photonic Computing	Nick Harris, Darius, Dr. Yichen Shen, Thomas Graham
2016	Astraeus Technologies	Medical Devices (Diagnostics)	Joe Azzarelli, Alex Blair, Jay Kumar, Graham Lieberman
2015	Raptor Maps	n/a	Nikhil Vadhavkar, Forrest Meyen, Edward Obropta
2014	Disease Diagnostic Group	n/a	
2013	3dim	Mobile Track	Andrea Colaço, Nan-Wei Gong, Vivek K. Goyal, Ahmed Kirmani, Nate Stewart, and Rahul Tejwani
2012	Filepicker.io	Mobile Track	Brett Van Zuiden, Anand Dass, David Chang, Thomas G
2011	Sanergy	Emerging Markets Track	David Auerbach, Lindsay Stradley, Ani Vallabhaneni
2010	C-Crete	Products & Services Track	Rouzbeh Shahsavari, Natanel Barookhian
2009	Ksplice	Web/IT Track	Tim Abbott, Jeff Arnold, Waseem Daher, Anders Kaseorg, Nelson Elhage
2008	Diagnostics for All	Life Sciences Track	Roozbeh Ghaffari, Jon Puz, Hayat Sindi, Gilbert Tang, Carol Waghorne, Krishna Yeshwant
2007	Robopsy	Medical Devices (for biopsies)	John Harthorne, Conor Walsh, Nevan Hanumara
2006	Semprus BioSciences (formerly SteriCoat)	Surface Modifications on Medical Devices	Chris Loose, David Lucchino, Joel Moxley, Mike Hencke and Vipin Gupta
2005	Balico	Medical Devices	Baruch Schori, Harry Lee, Kathleen Sienko, Jimmy Robertsson
2004	Active Joint Brace; Now:Myomo Inc.	Medical Devices	Mira Sahney, Kailas Narendran, John McBean, Joe Jackson, Hocking Chen, Raja Surapanani,
2003	SmartCells	Medical Devices	Todd C. Zion, Robert Bruch, Martin Curiel, John Hebert, Tsafrir Vanounou
1998	Direct Hit Technologies	Internet search engine	Mike Cassidy, Gary Culliss, Steven Yang
1992	Toolbox	Machine Tool Controller	Miles Arnone, Chad Clawson, Dan Berkery
1991	Stylus Innovation	Barcode-based remote shopping	Krisztina 'Z' Holly, Mike Cassidy, John Barrus

== Notable companies formed through the competition ==
Since its founding, the $100K Competition has helped launch more than 60 companies with an aggregate value of more than $10.5 billion. Prominent $100K alumni companies include Akamai, net. Genesis, and C-Bridge.

Year	Competition Result	Company	Result	Exit lue
1991	Grand-Prize Winner	Stylus Innovation	Acquired - 1996	$12.8M
1995	Finalist	Harmonix, Inc.	Acquired - 2006	$700M
1995	Finalist	Silicon Spice	Acquired by Broadcom	$1.2 billion
1996	Finalist	Webline Communications	Acquired by Cisco	$325M
1998	Grand-Prize Winner	Direct Hit	Acquired - 2000	$517M
1998	Runner-up	Akamai	IPO - 1999	$26.00 per share Current market cap: $12.50 Billion
2003	Finalist	Brontes Technologies	Acquired by 3M - 2006	$95M
2006	Finalist	HubSpot	CurrenMarket cap	$2.29 Billion
2010	Finalist	Pushpins	Acquired by Ebates - 2012	$10–17M
2010	Runner-Up	Flywire (fka PeerTransfer)	IPO - 2021	$250M

== History: MIT $10K/$50K/$100K Entrepreneurial Competition ==
The competition was founded in the 1989–1990 academic year and was initially intended as a promotional vehicle for the MIT Entrepreneurs Club and MIT New Ventures Association (which became the MIT E-Club.) Club members Richard Durling-Shyduroff, Marshall Van Alstyne, and Douglas Ling along with club Founder Peter Mui envisioned a cross-campus event that brought MIT's varied schools together to identify and support innovative ideas on campus. The goal was to create a safe, nurturing, (relatively controlled) sandbox environment where fledgling entrepreneurs could try their wings. The lead alumni donor was George Hatsopoulos of Thermo Electron. with additional generous support from other alumni, the Sloan School (Dean Lester Thurow) and Engineering School (Acting Dean Jack Kerrebrock.)

=== Managing Directors ===
Year	Name
2023	Stefan Sayre, Ping King, Santiago Tagle Llamosas
2022	Ezgi Emiroglu, Jimmy Teng, Graziano Gallitto
2021	Claire Beskin, Thierno Sylla, Samuel Lambert
2020	Akhilesh Koppineni, Christian Mirabile, Jennifer Shin
2019	Harry Kainen, Kat Krieger, Cy Schroeder
2018	Jake Guglin, Sandy Corrales
2017	Bar Kafri
2016	Monique Guimond
2015	Marc Chalifoux, Jake Auchincloss
2014	Peri AbouZied, Gino Korolev
2013	Ally Yost, Haya Al Ghanim
2012	Alice Francis, Adam Borelli
2011	Kourosh Kaghazian
2010	Daniel Vannoni
2009	Sombit Mishra, Brian Cantwell
2008	Frederic Kerrest
2007	Jeff Sabados
2006	Karina Drees
2005	Jason Fuller, Lawrence Walmsley
2004	Ian Blakely, Marcus Lopez
2003	Dan Riskin, Matt Richards
2002	Brian Curtis
2001	Michael Parduhn
2000	Elad Gil
1999	Heather Wilding
1998	Scott Blankstein
1997	Sally Shepard
1996	Will Clurman
1995	James Deverell
1994	Joost Bonsen
1993	Joost Bonsen
1992	Doug Ling
1991	Doug Ling
1990	Peter Mui, Doug Ling
1989	Peter Mui, Doug Ling

== Entrepreneurship for Development Competition ==
The Entrepreneurship for Development Competition is a competition for business plans that are judged on the following criteria: uniqueness of business idea, management strength, path to sustainability and social impact. The competition was added in 2006 as a complement to the Business Venture Competition due to increasing demand and interest in socially conscious ideas. In the spring, semi-finalists are selected from all business plan submissions. Semi-finalists submit more detailed business plans, and 5-6 finalists are then chosen. At the awards ceremony, the top team is awarded the Entrepreneurship for Development grand prize.

=== Winners - Entrepreneurship for Development Competition ===
In 1998, a dual award within the Venture Competition was awarded to a pair of finalists including Volunteer Community Connection. At the time, VCC was a non-traditional entry into the competition and has since served as a motivating example for the genesis of the MIT $100K Developmental Entrepreneurship Competition. As a result, they are listed as a winner and implicitly as an innovator within the Entrepreneurship for Development Competition.

Year	Winner	Description	Team Members
2007	Bagazo	Alternate Fuels from Agricultural Waste	Johan Löfström, Felicita Holsztejn, Jules D. Walter, Gerthy Lahens, Amy Banzaert
2006	CentroMigrante	Sustainable Housing for Migrant Communities	Illac Diaz, Neil Ruiz, Tina Laforteza, Artessa Salvidar-Sali, Bianca Locsin, Chester Yu
1998	Volunteer Community Connection	The Volunteer Community Connection enables the easy and automated sign-up and management of volunteers with non-profit agencies.	Michael Bryzek, Jonathan Allen, Oumi Mehrotra, Emily Sandberg, Mark Y. Sun

== See also ==
- Best of Biotech
- LiquiGlide
