= Akinori Yonezawa =

Japanese computer scientist (born 1947)

- 米澤 明憲
- Born: June 17, 1947 (age 79); Japan
- Education: University of Tokyo, MIT
- Known for: Concurrent/parallel object-oriented programming models and languages
- Awards: Dahl-Nygaard Prize(2008), ACM Fellow(1999), IPSJ Fellow(2004), JSSST Fellow (2008), Medal with Purple Ribbon(2009), Order of the Sacred Treasure(2020)
- Scientific career
- Fields: Computer Science
- Workplaces: University of Tokyo, MIT, Tokyo Institute of Technology, Chiba Institute of Technology
- Doctoral advisor: Carl Hewitt
- Doctoral students: Satoshi Matsuoka

Akinori Yonezawa (米澤 明憲, Yonezawa Akinori) (born June 17, 1947) is a Japanese computer scientist. Professor Emeritus of the University of Tokyo. Received Ph.D. from the Massachusetts Institute of Technology (MIT). Currently, a senior fellow at the Chiba Institute of Technology, Software Technology and Artificial Intelligence Research Center. Former member of the Science Council of Japan. Specializes in object-oriented programming languages, distributed computing and information security. From its beginning, he contributed to the promotion and development of object-oriented programming, which is the basis of programming languages most commonly used today (Python, Java, C++, etc.), and served as a program committee member and chairman of the main international conferences OOPSLA and ECOOP. At the same time, he is internationally known as a pioneer of the concepts and models of “concurrent/parallel objects". In software systems constructed based on concurrent/parallel objects, information processing and computation proceed by concurrent/parallel message passing among a large number of objects. Yonezawa's concurrent (parallel) objects are influenced by Actors, the concept of which was proposed by Carl Hewitt at MIT's AI Lab in the early 1970s and later rigorously formulated by Gul Agha. However, concurrent objects and actors are fundamentally different. An actor is an object that does not have a "state," whereas Yonezawa's concurrent (parallel) object can have a persistent state. For this reason, concurrent (parallel) objects are often used in implementing large parallel processing software systems. Large-scale software systems built and put into practical use based on concurrent (parallel) objects include an online virtual world system Second Life, social networking services such as Facebook and X (Twitter), and large-scale molecular dynamics simulation systems such as NAMD.

== Biography ==
He graduated from Azabu High School in 1966, and graduated from the University of Tokyo, Faculty of Engineering, Department of Mathematical Engineering in 1970. He received Ph.D. in Computer Science from the Massachusetts Institute of Technology, Department of Computer Science in 1977. His dissertation is entitled "Specification and verification techniques for parallel programs based on message passing semantics".

He engaged in research on parallel and distributed computing models at the MIT Computer Science and Artificial Intelligence Laboratory. After returning to Japan, he studied and taught at the Tokyo Institute of Technology and became a professor at the University of Tokyo, Department of Information Science in 1988. He held various positions of the University of Tokyo, including director of the Information Infrastructure Center. He was elected as a member of the Science Council of Japan in 2008. In 2011 he retired from the University of Tokyo and became a professor emeritus. He was awarded the Medal with Purple Ribbon in 2009 and the Order of the Sacred Treasure, Gold Rays with Neck Ribbon in 2020. After retiring from the University of Tokyo, he served as deputy director of the RIKEN Computational Science Institute until 2015, contributing to the operation of the supercomputer "K". Then, he served as Director of the Software Technology and Artificial Intelligence Research Center, the Chiba Institute of Technology until 2022. Currently, he is a senior fellow at the research center.

In 2012, an international symposium commemorating Yonezawa's 65th birthday was held in Kobe, and a collection of papers (Festschrift) authored by the symposium participants was published by German publisher Springer-Verlag in 2014.

An article overviewing Yonezawa's computer software research up to around 2003 was published in a journal of the Japan Society for Software Science and Technology.

Additionally in April 2026 at the National Institute of Informatics (NII), Yonezawa gave a talk (mainly for young researchers) entitled "From Curiosity About Language to Technology That Moves the World", which reflected on his own past research.

== Biographical chronology ==
- 1966 Graduated from Azabu Private High School
- 1970 Graduated from the University of Tokyo, Faculty of Engineering, Department of Mathematical Engineering
- 1972 Completed master's course at the University of Tokyo, Graduate School of Engineering, Mathematical Engineering
- 1974 Research Assistant, the Massachusetts Institute of Technology, Department of Electrical and Computer Science
- 1978 Completed doctoral course at the Massachusetts Institute of Technology, Department of Electrical and Computer Science
- 1978 Assistant, the Tokyo Institute of Technology, Faculty of Science
- 1983 Associate Professor, the Tokyo Institute of Technology, Faculty of Science
- 1988 Professor, the Tokyo Institute of Technology, Faculty of Science
- 1988 Professor, the University of Tokyo, Faculty of Science
- 1995 Chairman, the Japan Society for Software Science and Technology
- 2003 Professor, the University of Tokyo, Graduate School of Interdisciplinary Information Studies (transfer)
- 2006 Director, the University of Tokyo, Information Infrastructure Center
- 2006 Deputy Director, National Institute of Advanced Industrial Science and Technology (AIST), Information Security Research Center
- 2008 Member, the Science Council of Japan
- 2011 Professor Emeritus, the University of Tokyo
- 2011 Deputy Director, RIKEN Institute for Computational Science
- 2015 Director, the Chiba Institute of Technology, Software Technology and Artificial Intelligence Research Center
- 2022 Senior Fellow, the Chiba Institute of Technology

== Other public positions ==
He served as a member of the project evaluation and promotion committee for the Ministry of International Trade and Industry's Real World Computing (RWC), which began as a 10-year project in 1988. From April 2001 to March 2004, he was a member of the Cabinet Office Regulatory Reform Council and the chief of the Education and Research Working Group. He concurrently served as Auditor of the National Institute of Information and Systems, Director of Database Center for Life Science, and deputy director of the Information Security Research Center in the National Institute of Advanced Industrial Science and Technology(AIST). Furthermore, from April 2005 to March 2006, he was the chairman of the Sugimori Junior High School Regional School Management Council in Suginami Ward, Tokyo. A former member of Engine 01 Cultural Strategy Council.

== International & domestic academic roles and awards ==
He served as the chairperson and committee member of numerous international and domestic academic conferences and societies related to programming languages, object-oriented computing, and parallel & distributed computing, and served on the editorial board of academic journals and journals of American academic societies. He was awarded the title of ACM Fellow from the Association for Computing Machinery (ACM), Fellow of the Information Processing Society of Japan and Fellow of the Japan Society for Software Science and Technology. He served as chairman of the Japan Society for Software Science and Technology and scientific advisor to the German National Institute for Information Science and Technology (GMD). Furthermore, since 2006, he has served as a member of the TCAAB (Trustworthy Computing Academic Advisory Board) at Microsoft headquarters (Redmond, Washington).

In 2008, he received the Dahl-Nygaard Prize from the Association Internationale pour les Technologies Objets (AITO) as a proponent of the concept of "concurrent/parallel objects" and for his long-standing research results ranging from theory to practice. This award was given to him for the first time in Asia. He received the Medal with Purple Ribbon in 2009, the Okawa Prize in 2018 and the Order of the Sacred Treasure, Gold Rays with Neck Ribbon in 2020.

== Major awards chronology ==
- 1992 Okawa Publications Prize, Okawa Information and Communication Foundation
- 1999 Fellow, Association for Computing Machinery(ACM)
- 2004 Fellow, Japan Society for Software Science and Technology
- 2008 AITO Dahl-Nygaard Prize
- 2008 Distinguished Service Award, Japan Society for Software Science and Technology
- 2009 The Medal with Purple Ribbon
- 2009 FIT Funai Achievement Award, Funai Information Science Foundation
- 2010 Distinguished Achievement Award, Information Processing Society of Japan(IPSJ)
- 2011 Fellow, Information Processing Society of Japan
- 2018 Okawa Prize, Okawa Information and Communication Foundation
- 2018 Honorary member, Japan Society for Software Science and Technology
- 2020 The Order of the Sacred Treasure, Gold Rays with Neck Ribbon

== Honors ==
- 2009 The Medal with Purple Ribbon
- 2020 The Order of the Sacred Treasure, Gold Rays with Neck Ribbon

== Authored and edited main works ==
- “算法表現論(Algorithm Representation Theory),” (co-authored by Izumi Kimura and Akinori Yonezawa), Iwanami Shoten Publisher, 282 pages, 1982.
- "モデルと表現(Models and Representations)" (co-authored by Akinori Yonezawa and Etsuya Shibayama), Iwanami Shoten Publisher, 312 pages, 1992.
- “Object-Oriented Concurrent Programming,” (Eds. A. Yonezawa and M. Tokoro), MIT Press, 1987.
- “ABCL: an Object-Oriented Concurrent System,” (Ed. A. Yonezawa), MIT Press 1990.
- “Research Directions in Concurrent Object-oriented Programming,” (Eds. P. Wegner, G. Agha, A.Yonezawa), MIT Press, 1993.
- “My Software Research,” Computer Software, Vol.21, No.5, 2004.
