= Wintel =

Partnership between Microsoft Windows and Intel

Logos of Microsoft Windows and Intel

Wintel (portmanteau of Windows and Intel) is the partnership of Microsoft and Intel producing personal computers (PCs) using Intel x86-compatible processors running Microsoft's Windows operating system. The partnership has been running ever since 1985's release of Windows 1.0 but can date back further to 1981's release of the IBM Personal Computer.

== Background ==
By the early 1980s, the chaos and incompatibility that was rife in the early microcomputer market had given way to a smaller number of de facto industry standards, including the S-100 bus expansion board, the CP/M operating system, the Apple II home computer, the use of the programming language Microsoft BASIC in read-only memory (ROM), and the 5 1/4 inch floppy drive storage medium. Firms competed fiercely to control the industry, and innovation in hardware and software was the rule. Microsoft Windows and Intel processors gained ascendance and their ongoing alliance gave them market dominance.

Intel has claimed that this partnership has enabled the two companies to give customers the benefit of "a seemingly unending spiral of falling prices and rising performance". In addition, they claim a "history of innovation" and "a shared vision of flexible computing for the agile business".

== IBM ==
In 1981, IBM entered the microcomputer market. The IBM PC was created by a small subdivision of the firm. It was unusual for an IBM product because it was largely sourced from outside component suppliers and was intended to run third-party operating systems and software. IBM published the technical specifications and schematics of the PC, which allowed third-party companies to produce compatible hardware, the so-called open architecture. The IBM PC became one of the most successful computers of all time.

The key feature of the IBM PC was that it had IBM's enormous public respect behind it. It was an accident of history that the IBM PC happened to have an Intel CPU (instead of the technically superior Motorola 68000 that had been tipped for it, or an IBM in-house design), and that it shipped with IBM PC DOS (a licensed version of Microsoft's MS-DOS) rather than the CP/M-86 operating system, but these accidents were to have enormous significance in later years.

Because the IBM PC was an IBM product with the IBM badge, personal computers became respectable. It became easier for a business to justify buying a microcomputer than it had been even a year or two before, and easiest of all to justify buying the IBM Personal Computer. Since the PC architecture was well documented in IBM's manuals, and PC DOS was designed to be similar to the earlier CP/M operating system, the PC soon had thousands of different third-party add-in cards and software packages available. This made the PC the preferred option for many, since the PC supported the hardware and software they needed.

== Competitors ==
Industry competitors took one of several approaches to the changing market. Some (such as Apple, Amiga, Atari, and Acorn) persevered with their independent and quite different systems. Of those systems, Apple's Mac is the only one remaining on the market. Others (such as Digital, then the world's second-largest computer company, Hewlett-Packard, and Apricot) concentrated on making similar but technically advanced models. Other early market leaders (such as Tandy-Radio Shack or Texas Instruments) stayed with outdated architectures and proprietary operating systems for some time before belatedly realizing which way market trends were going and switching to the prevailing long-term business strategy, which was to build a machine that duplicated the IBM PC as closely as possible and sell it for a slightly lower price, or with higher performance. Given the very conservative engineering of the early IBM personal computers and their higher than average prices, this was not a terribly difficult task at first, bar only the great technical challenge of crafting a BIOS that duplicated the function of the IBM BIOS exactly but did not infringe on copyrights.

Two early participants in this strategy were start companies Columbia Data Products and Compaq. Both developed systems designed to be highly compatible with IBM personal computers, allowing them to run software intended for IBM machines without modification.

IBM's personal computer subsequently became the best-selling system in the market while several competing products were designed with a high degree of compatibility in order to support the same software ecosystem.

For the software industry, the effect was profound. First, it meant that it was rational to write for the IBM PC and its clones as a high priority, and port versions for less common systems at leisure.

Second (and even more importantly), when a software writer in pre-IBM days had to be careful to use as plain a subset of the possible techniques as practicable (so as to be able to run on any hardware that ran CP/M), with a major part of the market now all using the same exact hardware (or a very similar clone of it) it was practical to take advantage of any and every hardware-specific feature offered by the IBM.

Independent BIOS companies like Award, Chips and Technologies, and Phoenix began to market a clean room BIOS that was 100% compatible with IBM's, and from that time on any competent computer manufacturer could achieve IBM compatibility as a matter of routine.

From around 1984, the market was fast growing but relatively stable. There was as yet no sign of the "Win" half of "Wintel," though Microsoft was achieving large revenues from DOS sales both to IBM and to an ever-growing list of other manufacturers who had agreed to buy an MS-DOS license for every machine they made, even those that shipped with competing products. As for Intel, every PC made either had an Intel processor or one made by a second source supplier under license from Intel. Intel and Microsoft had large revenues, Compaq and many other makers between them made far more machines than IBM, but the power to decide the shape of the personal computer rested firmly in IBM's hands.

In 1987, IBM introduced the PS/2 computer line. Although the open architecture of the PC and its successors had been a great success for them, and they were the biggest single manufacturer, most of the market was buying faster and cheaper IBM-compatible machines made by other firms. The PS/2s remained software compatible, but the hardware was quite different. It introduced the technically superior Micro Channel architecture bus for higher speed communication within the system, but failed to maintain the open AT bus (later called the ISA bus), which meant that none of the millions of existing add-in cards would function. In other words, the new IBM machines were not IBM-compatible.

Further, IBM planned the PS/2 in such a way that for both technical and legal reasons it would be very difficult to clone. Instead, IBM offered to sell a PS/2 licence to anyone who could afford the royalty. They would not only require a royalty for every PS/2-compatible machine sold, but also a payment for every IBM-compatible machine the particular maker had ever made in the past.

Many PC manufacturers signed up as PS/2 licensees. (Apricot, who had lost badly by persevering with their "better PC than IBM" strategy up until this time, was one of them, but there were many others.) Many others decided to hold off before committing themselves. Some major manufacturers, known as the Gang of Nine, decided to group together and decide on a bus type that would be open to all manufacturers, as fast as or faster than IBM's Microchannel, and yet still retain backward compatibility with ISA.

This was the crucial turning point: the industry as a whole was no longer content to let IBM make all the major decisions about technical direction. In the event, the new EISA bus was itself a commercial failure beyond the high end: By the time the cost of implementing EISA was reduced to the extent that it would be implemented in most desktop PCs, the much cheaper VESA Local Bus had removed most of the need for it in desktop PCs (though it remained common in servers due to for example the possibility of data corruption on hard disk drives attached to VLB controllers), and Intel's PCI bus was just around the corner. But although very few EISA systems were sold, it had achieved its purpose: IBM no longer controlled the computer industry. IBM would belatedly amend the PS/2 series with the PS/ValuePoint line, which tracked the features of the emerging ad hoc platform.

At around this same time, the end of the 1980s and the beginning of the 1990s, Microsoft's Windows operating environment started to become popular, and Microsoft's competitor Digital Research started to recover a share of the DOS press and DOS market with DR-DOS. IBM planned to replace DOS with the vastly superior OS/2 (originally an IBM/Microsoft joint venture, and unlike the PS/2 hardware, highly backward compatible), but Microsoft preferred to push the industry in the direction of its own product, Windows. With IBM suffering its greatest ever public humiliation in the wake of the PS/2 disaster, massive financial losses, and a marked lack of company unity or direction, Microsoft's combination of a soft marketing voice and a big financial stick was effective: Windows became the de facto standard.

For the competing computer manufacturers, large or small, the only common factors to provide joint technical leadership were operating software from Microsoft, and CPUs from Intel.

== Dominance ==
Over the following years, both firms in the Wintel partnership would attempt to extend their dominance. Intel made a successful major push into the motherboard and chipset markets—becoming the largest motherboard manufacturer in the world and, at one stage, almost the only chipset manufacturer—but badly fumbled its attempt to move into the graphics chip market, and (from 1991) faced sharp competition in its core CPU territory from AMD, Cyrix, VIA and Transmeta.

Microsoft fared better. In 1990, Microsoft had two competitors in its core market (Digital Research and IBM), Intel had none. By 1996, Intel had two competitors in its core market (CPUs), while Microsoft had none. Microsoft had pursued a policy of insisting on per-processor royalties, thus making competing operating systems unattractive to computer manufacturers and provoking regulatory scrutiny from the European Commission and US authorities, leading to an undertaking by Microsoft to cease such practices. However, the integration of DOS into Windows 95 was the masterstroke: not only were the other operating system vendors frozen out, Microsoft could now require computer manufacturers to comply with its demands on pain of higher prices (as when it required IBM to stop actively marketing OS/2 or else pay more than twice as much for Windows 95 as its competitor Compaq) or by withholding "Designed for Windows 95" endorsement (which was regarded as an essential hardware marketing tool). Microsoft was also able to require that free publicity be given over to them by hardware makers. (For example, the Windows key advertising symbols on nearly all modern keyboards, or the strict license restrictions on what may or may not be displayed during system boot and on the Windows desktop.) Also, Microsoft was able to take over most of the networking market (formerly the domain of Artisoft's LANtastic and Novell's NetWare) with Windows NT, and the business application market (formerly led by Lotus and WordPerfect) with Microsoft Office.

Although Microsoft is by far the dominant player in the Wintel partnership now, Intel's continuing influence should not be underestimated. Intel and Microsoft, once the closest of partners, have operated at an uneasy distance from one another since their first major dispute, which had to do with Intel's heavy investment in the 32-bit optimized Pentium Pro and Microsoft's delivery of an unexpectedly high proportion of 16-bit code in Windows 95. Both firms talk with one another's competitors from time to time, most notably with Microsoft's close relationship with AMD and the development of Windows XP Professional x64 Edition utilizing AMD-designed 64-bit extensions to the x86 architecture, and Intel's decision to sell its processors to Apple Inc.

The Wintel platform is still the dominant desktop and laptop computer architecture.

During the 1990s, Intel CEO Andy Grove complained that Microsoft Windows and other software did not fully use Intel microprocessors' power. There have been opinions that Windows by its natural software bloat has eaten up much of the "hardware progress" that Intel processors gave to the "Wintel platform" via Moore's law, a phenomenon known as Andy and Bill's law. After the rise of smartphones and netbooks some media outlets have speculated predicting a possible end of Wintel dominance with more and more cheap devices employing other technologies. Intel is investing in Linux, and Microsoft ported Windows 8 to the ARM architecture with Windows RT.

== Modern situation ==
In the strictest sense, "Wintel" refers only to computers that run Windows on an Intel processor. However, Wintel is now commonly used to refer to a system running a modern Microsoft operating system on any modern x86-compatible CPU, manufactured by either Intel or AMD.

In mid-October 2017, Microsoft announced that Windows 10 on Qualcomm Snapdragon was at the final stage of testing.

== See also ==
- Apple–Intel architecture
- AIM alliance
- Mac transition to Intel processors
- IBM PC compatible
- Pocket PC
- Windows Mobile
- Network effect
- Computing platform
- Commodity computing
- PowerPC
- Dominant design

== Notes ==
- "Windows + Intel = Wintel?". Mayin.org.
- "Wintel — Hutchinson encyclopedia article about Wintel". Encyclopedia.farlex.com.
- Wolfgang Gruener (2008-09-16). "Cray launches deskside Wintel supercomputer". TG Daily.
- "WINTEL — What does WINTEL stand for? Acronyms and abbreviations by the Free Online Dictionary". Acronyms.thefreedictionary.com.
