= WWWW =

WWWW may refer to:

- WWWW-FM, a radio station (102.9 FM) licensed to Ann Arbor, Michigan, US
- WLLZ (FM), a radio station (106.7 FM) licensed to Detroit, Michigan, which used the call signs WWWW or WWWW-FM until October 2000
- Web.com, Inc. (NASDAQ symbol WWWW)
- World Wide Web Wanderer, a web crawler used to measure the size of the Web in 1993
- World-Wide Web Worm, an early Internet search engine

== See also ==
- WWW (disambiguation)
- Five Ws
