= Najdi.si =

Slovenian search engine

Najdi.si is a Slovenian search engine and web portal created by Interseek. It uses a technology created by Interseek. The technology is written entirely in Java.

Logo of the Najdi.si search engine

Today Najdi.si is owned and managed by the company TSmedia.

== See also ==
- Comparison of web search engines
- List of search engines
- Timeline of web search engines
- Noviforum
