= Gul Agha =

Gul Agha may refer to:

- Gul Agha Ishakzai, (born 1972), former head of the Finance Commission in Afghanistan
- Gul Agha Sherzai, (born 1954), Governor of Nangarhar province in Afghanistan
- Gul Agha (computer scientist), American computer scientist
