= Oscar Nierstrasz =

Swiss-Canadian software engineer and programmer (born 1957)

Oscar Marius Nierstrasz
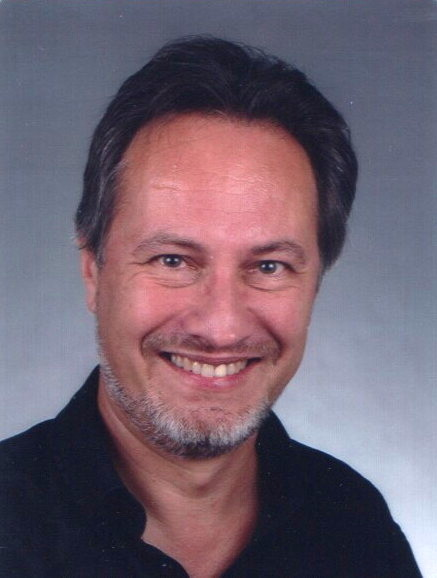
- Nierstrasz in 2008
- Born: Oscar Marius Nierstrasz; October 15, 1957 (age 68); Laren, the Netherlands
- Citizenship: Canada, Switzerland and Italy
- Education: University of Toronto
- Known for: Object-Oriented Reengineering Patterns, Pharo by Example, w3Catalog
- Awards: Dahl–Nygaard Prize
- Scientific career
- Fields: Computer Science, Programming languages, Object-oriented software design
- Workplaces: University of Toronto, Université de Genève, University of Berne
- Doctoral advisor: D. Tsichritzis

Oscar Marius Nierstrasz (born October 15, 1957) is a professor at the Computer Science Institute (IAM) at the University of Berne, and a specialist in software engineering and programming languages. He is active in the field of programming languages and mechanisms to support the flexible composition of high-level, component-based abstractions, tools and environments to support the understanding, analysis and transformation of software systems to more flexible, component-based designs, secure software engineering, and requirement engineering to support stakeholders and developers to have moldable and clear requirements. He has led the Software Composition Group at the University of Berne since 1994 to date (December 2011).

== Life ==
Nierstrasz was born in Laren, the Netherlands. He lived there for three years and then his parents, Thomas Oscar Duyck (1930--) and Meta Maria van den Bos (1936-1988) moved to Canada. He developed an early interest in Mathematics and Computer Science. He pursued his Bachelor studies in the Departments of Pure Mathematics and Combinatorics and Optimization at the University of Waterloo in 1979. He enrolled for the master studies in the Department of Computer Science at the University of Toronto in 1981. There, he continued for his Ph.D. under the supervision of Prof. D. Tsichritzis. During his postgraduate work in the university, Nierstrasz worked on the `Message Flow Analysis'. He finished his Ph.D. in 1984 and then worked at the Forth Institute of Computer Science in Crete for one year. Since 1985, Nierstrasz has lived in Switzerland. He was a member of the Object System Group at the Center Universitaire d' Informatique of the University of Geneva, Switzerland (1985-1994). He met there his wife, Angela Margiotta Nierstrasz. They married in May 1994. In late 1994, he moved to Bern, Switzerland to work as a professor.

== Career ==
In 1993 while at the University of Geneva Nierstrasz created W3Catalog one of the world’s earliest known search engines. The program used a bot to find pages and then mirror them on the site.

In late 1994, he joined the University of Berne as a professor and led the software composition group at the University of Berne from 1994 to December 2021. He has also served as a dean of Computer Science Institute (IAM) at the University of Berne. During his career, he supervised 40 Ph.D. students and almost 100 bachelors and masters theses.

He had made various contributions to Software Engineering Research community:

- Nierstrasz co-authored several books such as Object-Oriented Reengineering Patterns and Pharo by Example. He was editor of the Journal of Object Technology from 2010 to 2013, succeeding the founding editor, Richard Wiener.
- CyberChair, an Online Submission and Reviewing System, is based on Oscar Nierstrasz's publication called Identify the champion, where he described the peer review process for contributions to scientific conferences using an organizational pattern language.

His Erdos number is 3. Oscar Nierstrasz — David M. Jackson — E. Rodney Canfield — Paul Erdös

Nierstrasz won the Senior Dahl–Nygaard Prize in 2013.
