= Pipilika =

Web search engine

- Pipilika Logo
- Website type: Web search engine
- Available in: Bengali, English
- Country of origin: Bangladesh
- Owner: Shahjalal University of Science and Technology
- Creators: SUST Students and Faculties
- Website: https://pipilika.com/
- Registration: Optional
- Launched: 13 April 2013
- Current status: inactive

Pipilika (Bengali: পিপীলিকা) was a Bangladeshi search engine and the first search engine introduced by Bangladesh. It was launched in 2013 to cater to the linguistic and cultural needs of the Bengali-speaking population. The search engine was shut down in 2021.

It is the country's first Bangla search engine developed by the Computer Science and Engineering students of Shahjalal University of Science and Technology as a thesis project.

== Shutdown ==
Pipilika was shut down in 2021. As it was a university project and not a commercial project, it didn't receive proper funding in order to develop it as a revenue generating medium. It also had no promotional content about it, which made most people unaware of the existence of Pipilika.

== See also ==
- Comparison of web search engines
- List of search engines
- Timeline of web search engines
- Noviforum
