= Sienko =

Sienko or Sieńko is a Ukrainian or Polish surname (respectively), derived as a diminutive of the given name Simon (Semen in Ukrainian and Siemion in Polish). Notable people with the surname include:

- Kathleen Sienko, American biomechanical engineer and professor
- Krzysztof Sieńko (born 1976), Polish bobsledder
