= Torlak (disambiguation) =

Torlak is a group of dialects of South Slavic languages. Torlak may also refer to:

- Torlak (Belgrade), a neighborhood of Belgrade
  - FK Torlak, Serbian football club based in Belgrade
- Emina Torlak, American computer scientist
- Nera Torlak, Croatian beauty pageant contestant
- Sedin Torlak, Bosnian footballer and football manager
- Torlak Kemal (died 1419), leader in a revolt against the Ottoman Empire
