= Krisztina Holly =

American engineer

Krisztina 'Z' Holly
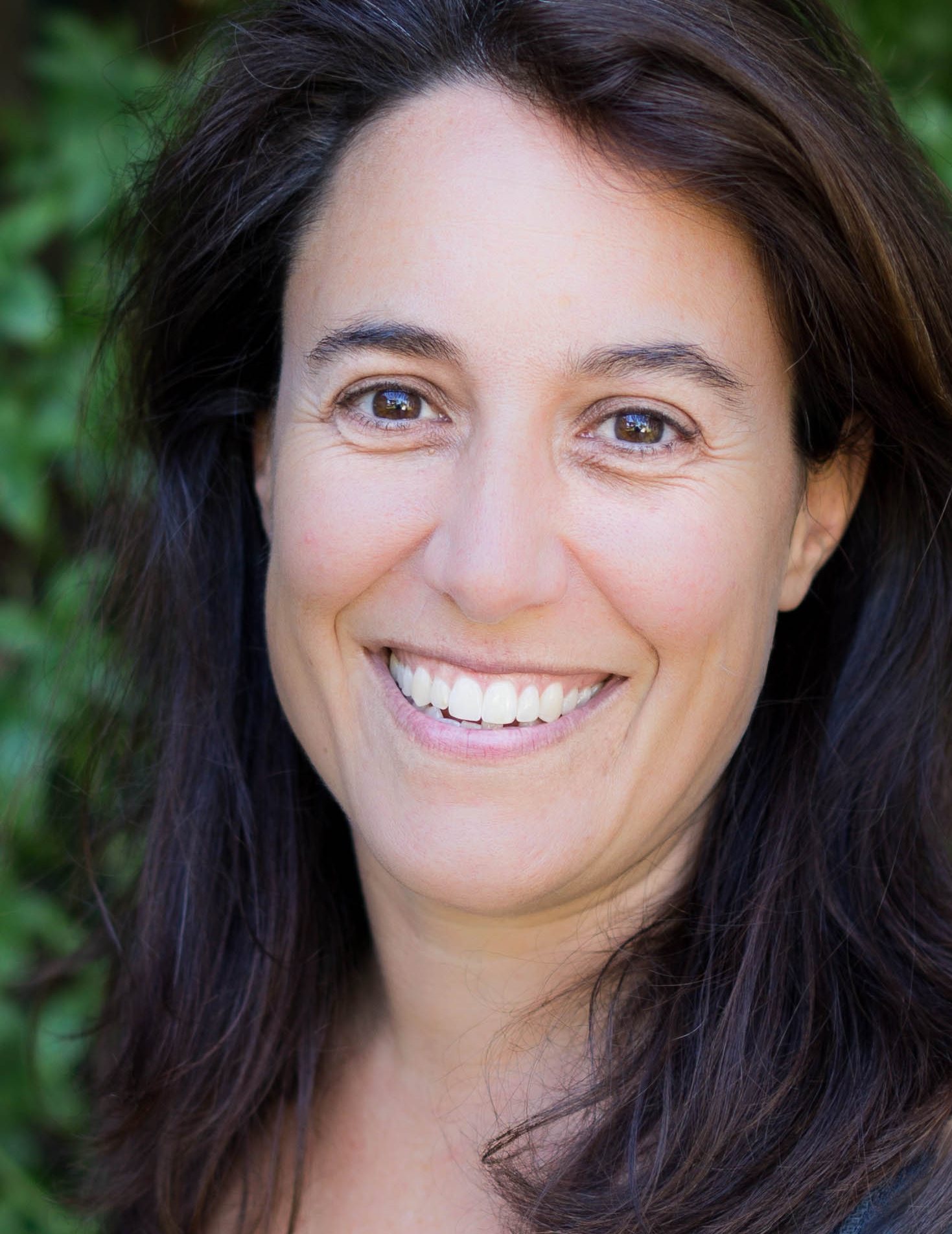
- Holly in 2013
- Occupations: Innovator and entrepreneur

Krisztina "Z" Holly is a Hungarian-American entrepreneur.

Holly is best known as being the creator of TEDxUSC, the founding executive director of the Deshpande Center for Technological Innovation at the MIT, and the vice provost and founding executive director of the Stevens Center for Innovation at the University of Southern California.

== Early life and education ==
Holly was born to Hungarian parents who were refugees to America in 1956. She attended the Massachusetts Institute of Technology and received bachelor's and master's degrees in mechanical engineering.

She, Michael Cassidy, and John Barrus won the MIT $100K Entrepreneurship Competition in 1991 for Stylus Innovation, which was acquired by Artisoft in 1996 for $12.8 million. She is married and resides in Los Angeles.

== Career ==
Holly started her career as an undergraduate researcher at the MIT Media Lab, working on the world's first full-color computer-generated reflection hologram. She was co-founder of the computer telephony integration company Stylus Innovation, which was acquired by Artisoft. and subsequently joined other tech and media startups including Direct Hit Technologies (acquired by Ask Jeeves) and Jeeves Solutions.

From 2002 to 2006, she was the founding executive director of the MIT Deshpande Center. From 2006 to 2012, she was the vice provost for innovation at USC and founding executive director the USC Stevens Center for Innovation. While she was at MIT and USC, the centers assisted 39 startups with university research.

Holly launched TEDxUSC, the first-ever TEDx event, in 2009. In her role as curator and host for TEDxUSC over four years, she discovered and coached more than 60 presenters.

Holly spent nearly three years in documentary production. She is the host of The Art of Manufacturing podcast and served as the founder and president of MAKE IT IN LA, which was launched during her term as Entrepreneur-in-Residence for LA Mayor Eric Garcetti.

She is a founding board member of the River LA and serves on the board of TTI/Vanguard. Holly has also been an advisor to many other companies and organizations, including the National Advisory Council on Innovation and Entrepreneurship and the World Economic Forum.

Holly was named Champion of Free Enterprise by Forbes in 2009 and has been recognized by Rolling Stone, Wired, The New York Times, and Entrepreneur. She has been a contributor to Forbes, The Economist, Bloomberg Businessweek, HuffPost, CNN, NASA ASK, Strategy+Business, World Economic Forum, Science Progress, Innovation Management, and Mountain Bike Magazine.
