= Henry Baker (computer scientist) =

American computer scientist

- Education: MIT
- Awards: ACM Distinguished Member
- Scientific career
- Thesis: Actor systems for real-time computation (1978)
- Doctoral advisor: Carl Hewitt
- Website: blog.plover.com/prog/Henry-Baker.html

Henry Givens Baker Jr. is an American computer scientist who has made contributions in garbage collection, functional programming languages, and linear logic. He was one of the founders of Symbolics, a company that designed and manufactured a line of Lisp machines. In 2006, he was recognized as an ACM Distinguished Member.

He is notable for his research in garbage collection, particularly Baker's real-time copying collector, and on the Actor model.

Baker received his B.Sc. (1969), S.M. (1973), E.E. (1973), and Ph.D. (1978) degrees at M.I.T.

The Chicken Scheme compiler was inspired by an innovative design of Baker's.

== Bibliography ==
- Hewitt, Carl; Baker, Henry (August 1–5, 1977), "Actors and Continuous Functionals", Proceeding of IFIP Working Conference on Formal Description of Programming Concepts
- Hewitt, Carl; Baker, Henry G. (1977), "Laws for Communicating Parallel Processes", IFIP Congress: 987–92
- Baker, Henry (January 1978), Actor Systems for Real-Time Computation (EECS Doctoral Dissertation), Cambridge: Massachusetts Institute of Technology
- Baker, Henry G. (1978), "Shallow binding in LISP 1.5", Communications of the ACM, 21 (7): 565–9, doi:10.1145/359545.359566, hdl:1721.1/41975, S2CID 10567619
- Baker, Henry G. (4 April 1978), "List processing in real time on a serial computer.", Communications of the ACM, 21 (4): 280–294, doi:10.1145/359460.359470, hdl:1721.1/41976, S2CID 17661259
