= LiquiGlide =

Platform technology

LiquiGlide was a platform technology which creates slippery, liquid-impregnated surfaces that was developed at the Varanasi Research Group at Massachusetts Institute of Technology by Prof. Kripa Varanasi and his team of students and post doctorals Dave Smith, Rajeev Dhiman, Adam Paxson, Brian Solomon, and Chris Love. Possible applications include improving the flow rate of condiment bottles to avoid food waste, and preventing clogs in gas and oil tubes. The project came in second place in the Business Plan Contest and won the Audience Choice Award at the 2012 MIT $100K Entrepreneurship Competition. In March 2015, LiquiGlide signed a deal with Elmer's Products, the first company to use the technology. As of January 2017, the company had raised $25M from investors including Roadmap Capital, Structure Capital, Valia Investments, and Struck Capital. As of 2025, the company is no longer operating.
