= Adaptive fluid-infused porous film =

Adaptive fluid-infused porous films change states when stretched, allowing for dynamic control over transparency and wettability. They were developed by researchers at Harvard University. The same team previously invented Slippery Liquid Infused Porous Surfaces (SLIPS) which served as the base technology to control wettability in Adaptive fluid-infused porous film.

== Description ==
The material is a thin elastic film that contains nano-sized pores. When in a normal relaxed state, if droplets of liquid are applied to the film, they will roll freely along the smooth surface. However, when the film is stretched, any droplets of liquid that are applied to the film will be held in place on the film. If the tension on the film is later released, the film will return to its normal relaxed state, and the droplet will again move along the smooth surface. The film also becomes more transparent when stretched, allowing the material to be dynamically controlled with regards to both the wettability and transparency of the material.
