= William Clinger (computer scientist) =

American computer scientist and associate professor at Northeastern University

Professor William D. Clinger
- Citizenship: United States
- Education: PhD, MIT
- Known for: Actor model denotational semantics; Scheme IEEE–ANSI standards
- Scientific career
- Fields: Computer science
- Institutions: Northeastern University
- Doctoral advisor: Carl Hewitt

William D. Clinger is an associate professor in the Khoury College of Computer Sciences at Northeastern University. He is known for his work on higher-order and functional programming languages, and for extensive contributions in helping create and implement international technical standards for the programming language Scheme via the Institute of Electrical and Electronics Engineers (IEEE) and American National Standards Institute (ANSI). Clinger was an editor of the second through fifth Revised Reports on Scheme (R^{2}RS – R^{5}RS), and an invited speaker on Scheme at the Lisp50 conference celebrating the 50th birthday of the language Lisp. He has been on the faculty at Northeastern University since 1994.

== Research ==
Clinger obtained his PhD from the Massachusetts Institute of Technology (MIT) under the supervision of Carl Hewitt. His doctoral research revolved around defining a denotational semantics for the actor model of concurrent computing, which is the same model of computing that originally motivated development of Scheme.

In addition to editing the R^{2}RS – R^{5}RS Scheme standards, Clinger's contributions to Scheme have included the development of compilers for two implementations of the language: MacScheme, and Larceny. He also invented efficient algorithms for hygienic macro expansion, accurate decimal-to-binary conversions, and bounded-latency generational garbage collection.
