= W3Catalog =

Retired early Internet search engine created in 1993

W3 Catalog was an early web search engine, first released on September 2, 1993 by developer Oscar Nierstrasz at the University of Geneva.

The engine was initially given the name jughead, but then later renamed. Unlike later search engines, like Aliweb, which attempt to index the web by crawling over the accessible content of web sites, W3 Catalog exploited the fact that many high-quality, manually maintained lists of web resources were already available. W3 Catalog simply mirrored these pages, reformatted the contents into individual entries, and provided a Perl-based front-end to enable dynamic querying.

At the time, CGI did not yet exist, so W3 Catalog was implemented as an extension to Tony Sander's Plexus web server, implemented in Perl.

W3 Catalog was retired on November 8, 1996.

In February 2010, the domain name w3catalog.com was acquired, and like the original index, each new website entry was manually reviewed before being added. The site was dormant again by 2023.
