= James Noble (computer scientist) =

New Zealand computer scientist

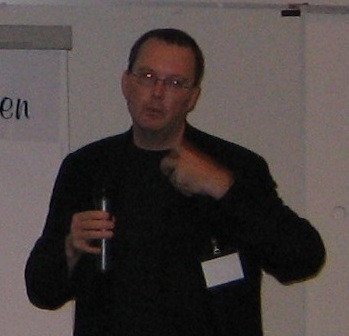
- at the WikiSym 2006
- Education: Victoria University of Wellington
- Awards: AITO Dahl-Nygaard Prize
- Scientific career
- Fields: Computer Science
- Workplaces: Victoria University of Wellington
- Thesis: (1996)
- Website: ecs.victoria.ac.nz/Main/JamesNoble

James Noble is a New Zealand computer scientist who was the 2016 winner of the Dahl-Nygaard Prize for research in software engineering. In 2008 he received the Most Influential OOPSLA Paper Award for the 1998 paper "Ownership types for flexible alias protection."

He was Professor of Computer Science at Victoria University of Wellington in New Zealand until February 2022. Noble is a Fellow of the Institute of IT Professionals of New Zealand and the British Computer Society and has contributed to object-oriented and aspect-oriented approaches to software design.

== Selected publications ==
- Clarke, David G., John M. Potter, and James Noble. "Ownership types for flexible alias protection." In Proceedings of the 13th ACM SIGPLAN conference on Object-oriented programming, systems, languages, and applications, pp. 48-64. 1998.
- Tempero, Ewan, Craig Anslow, Jens Dietrich, Ted Han, Jing Li, Markus Lumpe, Hayden Melton, and James Noble. "The qualitas corpus: A curated collection of java code for empirical studies." In 2010 Asia pacific software engineering conference, pp. 336-345. IEEE, 2010.
- Hoda, Rashina, James Noble, and Stuart Marshall. "Self-organizing roles on agile software development teams." IEEE Transactions on Software Engineering 39, no. 3 (2012): 422-444.
- Noble, James, Jan Vitek, and John Potter. "Flexible alias protection." In ECOOP’98—Object-Oriented Programming: 12th European Conference Brussels, Belgium, July 20–24, 1998 Proceedings 12, pp. 158-185. Springer Berlin Heidelberg, 1998.
