= Jennifer S. Cole =

American linguist

- Education: Massachusetts Institute of Technology
- Spouse: Gul Agha
- Children: 3
- Scientific career
- Fields: Linguistics
- Workplaces: University of Illinois Urbana-Champaign, Northwestern University
- Thesis: Planar Phonology and Morphology (1987)
- Doctoral advisor: Morris Halle
- Website: sites.northwestern.edu/cole

Jennifer Sandra Cole is a professor of linguistics, Director of the Prosody and Speech Dynamics Lab, and Chair of the Department of Linguistics at Northwestern University. Her research uses experimental and computational methods to study the sound structure of language. She was formerly Professor of Linguistics at the University of Illinois Urbana-Champaign. Professor Cole served as the founding General Editor of Laboratory Phonology (2009–2015) and a founding member of the Association for Laboratory Phonology.

== Biography ==
Her Ph.D. dissertation, Planar Phonology and Morphology, was completed in 1987, under the supervision of Morris Halle, at the Massachusetts Institute of Technology's Department of Linguistics and Philosophy. In 1991, the study was recognized by Garland Publishing and presented as an Outstanding Dissertation in Linguistics. Cole introduced ranked constraints in formal grammar to model the interaction between morphology and phonology. This was one of the first works in the generative phonology framework to model phonological grammar using constraint ranking, an approach which has been developed in Optimality Theory.

A primary focus of Cole's research is on variation in the phonetic expression of words and the role of prosodic phrasing and prominence in influencing phonetic variation. She applies linguistic models of prosody to research in computer speech recognition.

Cole has carried out field research and authored encyclopedia articles on Sindhi (Indo-Aryan). She served on the board of trustees of the American Institute of Pakistan Studies (2006–2009).

Cole promotes speech and language research in the broader context of interdisciplinary science in past roles as co-chair of the Biological Intelligence research theme at the Beckman Institute for Advanced Science and Technology (2010–2016), and as Chair of Section Z (2016) of the American Association for the Advancement of Science (AAAS). She has served as an elected member of the Executive Council of the Linguistic Society of America (2007–2010).

== Personal life ==
Jennifer Cole is married to Gul Agha, with whom she has three daughters.

== Selected publications ==
- "Positional biases in predictive processing of intonation", 2020
- "Perception of word-level prominence in free word order language discourse", 2019
- "Prosody in context: A review", 2015
- "Signal-based and expectation-based factors in the perception of prosodic prominence", 2010
- "The role of syntactic structure in guiding prosody perception with ordinary listeners and everyday speech", 2010
- "Unmasking the acoustic effects of vowel-to-vowel coarticulation: A statistical modeling approach", 2010
- "Prosodic effects on acoustic cues to stop voicing and place of articulation: Evidence from Radio News speech", 2007
- "An Optimal Domains theory of vowel harmony", 1995
