= Liquid-impregnated surface =

A slippery liquid-infused porous surface (SLIPS), liquid-impregnated surface (LIS), or multi-phase surface consists of two distinct layers. The first is a highly textured or porous substrate with features spaced sufficiently close to stably contain the second layer which is an impregnating liquid that fills in the spaces between the features. The liquid must have a surface energy well-matched to the substrate in order to form a stable film. Slippery surfaces are finding applications in commercial products, anti-fouling surfaces, anti-icing and biofilm-resistant medical devices.

Adaptive Surface Technologies and LiquiGlide are commercial examples of liquid-impregnated surfaces, invented at Harvard University and the Massachusetts Institute of Technology.

SLIPS type surfaces have a number of advantages over traditional lotus based superhydrophobic surfaces. The free flowing liquid allows for the creation of a smooth surface with the ability to self-repair. This smooth surface often results in a low sliding angle for both high and low surface tension liquids, enhancing droplet shedding and heat transfer. Finally, SLIPS surfaces can be made optically transparent unlike many traditional superhydrophobic surfaces that scatter light due to having structure on the same order as visible light.

However, the longevity of SLIPS for prolonged anti-icing applications have been of concern. In this regard, replacing the lubricant in SLIPS with a phase switching liquid (PSL) can yield promising results. PSLs are a class of phase change materials, which are in liquid state under ambient conditions and have a melting point higher than the freezing point of water. Thus the PSL changes into solid phase in a cold environment before water freezing can happen. While PSL impregnated textured surface behave as a traditional SLIPS in ambient conditions, when operated below the melting point of PSL, they resist PSL displacement out of surface texture by water, engendering enhanced icephobicity even on hydrophilic substrates.

== See also ==
- Adaptive fluid-infused porous film
