= Mike Cassidy (entrepreneur) =

American businessman

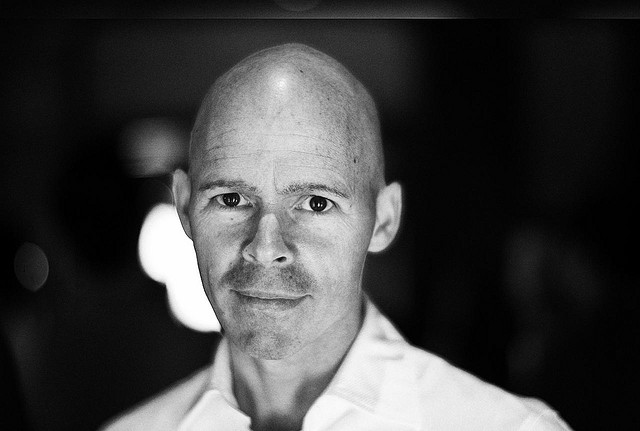
- Born: Michael Cassidy c. 1963
- Citizenship: American
- Education: Massachusetts Institute of Technology (BS, MS); Harvard Business School; Berklee College of Music
- Occupations: Entrepreneur, business executive
- Years active: 1990s–present
- Employer: Google
- Known for: Founding multiple startups including Stylus Innovation, Direct Hit, Xfire, and Ruba; leadership of Project Loon
- Notable work: Apollo Fusion (co-founder and CEO)
- Awards: DEMO Lifetime Achievement Award

Mike Cassidy is an American entrepreneur. He was CEO and co-founder of five Internet start-ups, including Stylus Innovation, Direct Hit, Xfire, Ruba.com, and Apollo Fusion.

In January 2012, he became director of product management and, subsequently, a Vice President at Google. Cassidy also led Project Loon with Google[x].

== Education ==
Cassidy was educated at the Massachusetts Institute of Technology (BS '85, MS '86 in Aerospace Engineering), Harvard Business School (1991), and studied jazz piano at the Berklee College of Music.

== Career ==
His first success, Stylus Innovation, was started with $500 each from Cassidy and his two co-founders, Krisztina Holly and John Barrus, and subsequently won the MIT 10K (now called the MIT $100K Entrepreneurship Competition). The company was later sold to Artisoft for $13 million in 1996. His second effort was early Internet search engine Direct Hit, sold to Ask Jeeves for $532.5 million in January 2000, only 500 days after launch. Cassidy's next effort was Xfire, a freeware instant messaging service aimed at gamers. Xfire was sold to Viacom on April 25, 2006, for $110 million.

After a stint as an EIR at Benchmark Capital, Cassidy founded Ruba with Arnaud Weber, who was previously a technical lead for the Chrome browser project at Google. Ruba was acquired by Google in May, 2010.

In April 2017, it was reported he was working on a clean energy startup, Apollo Fusion, using a hybrid reactor technology based on fusion power. Cassidy co-founded and served as CEO of Apollo Fusion before the company was acquired by Astra (NASDAQ:ASTR) on June 7, 2021, for $145 million.

Cassidy is perhaps best known for promoting "speed as the primary business strategy." He has given numerous talks on the subject, and his Slideshare presentation has received over 75,900 views.

== Awards ==
Cassidy is the recipient of the DEMO Lifetime Achievement award.
