= TTI/Vanguard =

TTI/Vanguard is an advanced technology research membership for senior-level executives. Headquartered in Santa Monica, California, TTI/Vanguard explores emerging and potentially disruptive technologies and their global impact. Four times annually, corporate and government leaders, entrepreneurs, researchers, and academics meet to discuss prospective future technology at its conferences. TTI/Vanguard offers its members conferences, field trips, workshops, and access to its extensive web archives on a diverse range of IT topics related to advanced technologies.

In January 2013, TTI/Vanguard was acquired by Euromoney Institutional Investor.

== Advisory board and faculty ==
Initially cofounded in 1991 by Dr. Richard Schroth and Chunka Mui of Computer Science Corporation (CSC), the group, then called Vanguard, has evolved over the years. Prior to 2020, programs were developed and led by its advisory board, which over time comprised John Perry Barlow, Gordon Bell, Maria Bezaitis, Peter Cochrane, Deborah Estrin, Eric Haseltine, Michael Hawley, Ken Hertz, Krisztina “Z” Holly, Alan Kay, Len Kleinrock, Doug Lenat, Ellen Levy, Bob Lucky, Nicholas Negroponte, David Reed, Clay Shirky, Larry Smarr, and Eben Upton.

From 2020 onward, the following editorial advisory board members guide the program: Steven Cherry, Stephen DeAngelis, Dan Gould, Krisztina "Z" Holly, Len Kleinrock, Ellen Levy, John Miranda, Ike Nassi, Martin Reeves, Jennifer Sample, K Krasnow Waterman, Geoffrey West, and Laurie Yoler.

They identify thought leaders and innovators from a multiplicity of backgrounds and disciplines to speak at TTI/Vanguard meetings.

== Conferences ==
Each TTI/Vanguard conference lasts two days and features workshops and optional field trips to local academic and corporate R&D labs. Conference recordings and documents are promptly archived in a repository accessible to TTI/Vanguard members only.

=== Speakers ===
TTI/Vanguard’s presenters include technologists, entrepreneurs, academicians, scientists, futurists, authors, journalists, and business leaders.

=== Format ===
TTI/Vanguard conferences are interactive.

Author David Weinberger has described his experience as a speaker as follows:

"Everyone in the audience has a microphone and is encouraged to interrupt with questions and disagreements. So, I didn't make it all the way through my talk, which is common here. Unsurprisingly, the comments were quite trenchant. ... I should have figured more audience-conversation time into my talk. I was well into describing tagging when the big red light flashed, and I didn't get to the conclusions I outlined in my previous post."

According to another speaker, Dr. Paul Miller:

"The audience is senior, and easily one of the most engaged I've come across for a while. After a ten-minute grace period, presenters are pelted with questions and comments, and I've only seen a couple get all the way through their prepared slides. It's refreshing to see attendees making sure they get what they want, rather than listening semi-soporifically to one prepared pitch after another. It should also be good for the speaker, as at least they’re having the audience engage."

=== Press ===
TTI/Vanguard is a private forum. No press is permitted in TTI/Vanguard sessions, and it does not publish its findings for the public.

Jeff Jonas, an engineer and scientist who spoke at one of the conferences, stated:

"There is this organization called TTI/Vanguard. I swear I had never heard of them. Based on the roads I travel and the company I keep—I must have been living in a box."

== Profile of TTI/Vanguard Member Organizations ==
TTI/Vanguard member organizations represent global private, public, and academic sectors. Members include brand-name manufacturers, cutting-edge software and hardware developers, aerospace and defense companies, financial and investment institutions, insurers, retailers, pharmaceutical and healthcare groups, telecommunications firms, corporate and government labs, service providers and consulting groups, energy and chemical companies, broadcasters, food and beverage companies, universities, and advisors in international government agencies.

== Business model ==
TTI/Vanguard is a subscription-based organization. Its conferences may be attended only by members. Membership entitles members to attend four consecutive conferences and several regional events throughout the year. The organization does not allow attendance at single conferences.
