= Dahl–Nygaard Prize =

Science and technology award

The Dahl–Nygaard Prize is awarded annually to a senior researcher with outstanding career contributions and a younger researcher who has demonstrated great potential. The senior prize is recognized as one of the most prestigious prizes in the area of software engineering, though it is a relatively new prize.

The winners of both awards are announced at the European Conference on Object Oriented Programming (ECOOP). The prizes are named after Ole-Johan Dahl and Kristen Nygaard, two Norwegian pioneers in the area of programming and simulation. The prize was created by the Association Internationale pour les Technologies Objets (AITO) in 2004.

== Selected recipients ==
- 2026, Brussels: Peter Müller (senior prize) and Yishou Zhang (junior prize))
- 2025, Bergen: Mira Mezini (senior prize) and Amir Shaikhha (junior prize)
- 2024, Vienna: Rachid Guerraoui (senior prize) and Alvin Cheung (junior prize)
- 2023, Seattle: Sophia Drossopoulou (senior prize) and Heather Miller (junior prize)
- 2022, Berlin: Dan Ingalls (senior prize) and Magnus Madsen (junior prize)
- 2021, Aarhus: Kim Bruce (senior prize) and Karim Ali (junior prize)
- 2020, Berlin: Jan Vitek (senior prize) and Jonathan Bell (junior prize)
- 2019, London: Laurie Hendren (senior prize) and Ilya Sergey (junior prize)
- 2018, Amsterdam: Lars Bak (senior prize) and Guoqing Harry Xu (junior prize)
- 2017, Barcelona: Gilad Bracha (senior prize) and Ross Tate (junior prize)
- 2016, Rome: James Noble (senior prize), and Emina Torlak (junior prize)
- 2015, Prague: Bjarne Stroustrup (senior prize) and Alexander J. Summers (junior prize)
- 2014, Uppsala: William Cook (senior prize), Robert France (senior prize), and Tudor Gîrba (junior prize)
- 2013, Montpellier: Oscar Nierstrasz (senior prize) and Matthew Parkinson (junior prize)
- 2012, Beijing: Gregor Kiczales (senior prize) and Tobias Wrigstad (junior prize)
- 2011, Lancaster: Craig Chambers (senior prize) and Atsushi Igarashi (junior prize)
- 2010, Maribor: Doug Lea (senior prize) and Erik Ernst (junior prize)
- 2009, Genoa: David Ungar (senior prize)
- 2008, Paphos: Akinori Yonezawa (senior prize) and Wolfgang De Meuter (junior prize)
- 2007, Berlin: Luca Cardelli (senior prize) and Jonathan Aldrich (junior prize)
- 2006, Nantes: Erich Gamma, Richard Helm, Ralph Johnson, and (posthumously) John Vlissides
- 2005, Glasgow: Bertrand Meyer (senior prize) and Gail C. Murphy (junior prize)

== See also ==
- List of computer science awards
