= Rachid Guerraoui =

Moroccan-Swiss computer scientist and academic

- Born: January 5, 1967 (age 59); Rabat, Morocco
- Citizenship: Morocco, Switzerland
- Education: École supérieure d'informatique électronique automatique (ESIEA); Pierre and Marie Curie University
- Known for: distributed computing, concurrent computing, popular science
- Awards: ACM Fellow (2012); Chair in Distributed Computing, Collège de France (2018–19); Dahl-Nygaard Senior Prize (2024)
- Scientific career
- Fields: Computer science
- Workplaces: EPFL, HP Labs
- Thesis: Programmation Répartie par Objets : Études et Propositions (1992)
- Doctoral advisor: Christian Fluhr
- Website: dcl.epfl.ch/rachid/

Rachid Guerraoui (born January 5, 1967) is a Moroccan-Swiss computer scientist and a Full Professor in the School of Computer and Communication Sciences (IC) at EPFL, known for his contributions in the fields of concurrent and distributed computing. He is an ACM Fellow and an associate (area) editor of the Journal of the ACM. In 2018–19, he held the position of Chair in Informatics and Computational Science for Distributed Computing at the Collège de France.

== Education and career ==
Guerraoui was born on January 5, 1967, in Rabat, Morocco. His father, Mohammed Guerraoui, is a teacher of mathematics and former wali (governor) of Marrakesh. His mother, Fatima Rahmoun-Guerraoui, is a teacher of French. After getting his baccalaureate in 1984, he left Morocco for France. Guerraoui earned simultaneous Master’s degrees in Computer Engineering from the École supérieure d'informatique électronique automatique (ESIEA) and in Computer Science from the Pierre and Marie Curie University in 1989, supported by a scholarship at the Centre de Recherche of the École des Mines of Paris. In 1992, he earned his PhD from the Université d’Orsay, advised by Christian Fluhr and supported by the French Alternative Energies and Atomic Energy Commission of Saclay. His doctoral dissertation was titled Programmation Répartie par Objets : Études et Propositions. He then started as a postdoctoral researcher at EPFL and was appointed to the computer science faculty in 1999, after stints at HP Labs and MIT.

Guerraoui's honors include an ERC Advanced Grant Award (2013), the Google Focused Award (2014), the Middleware 2014 Best Paper and 10-Years Best Paper Awards, and the Dahl–Nygaard Senior Prize (2024). He was named an ACM Fellow in 2012 and was appointed Chair in Informatics and Computational Science for Distributed Computing, 2018–2019, by the Collège de France—the first Moroccan to receive either appointment.

With various collaborators, Guerraoui has written several technical and general-audience books:

- Guerraoui, Rachid; Gupta, Nirupam; Pinot, Rafael (2024). Robust Machine Learning: Distributed Methods for Safe AI. Machine Learning: Foundations, Methodologies, and Applications. Singapore: Springer. doi:10.1007/978-981-97-0688-4. ISBN 978-981-97-0690-7. ISSN 2730-9908.
- Guerraoui, Rachid; Hoang, Lê Nguyên (2020). Turing à la plage : L'intelligence artificielle dans un transat (in French). Dunod. ISBN 9782100795550.
- Guerraoui, Rachid (2019). L'algorithmique répartie : À la recherche de l'universalité perdue. Leçons inaugurales du Collège de France (in French). Fayard. ISBN 9782213712406.
- Guerraoui, Rachid; Kuznetsov, Petr (2018). Algorithms for Concurrent Systems. EPFL Press. ISBN 9782889152834.
- Cachin, Christopher; Guerraoui, Rachid; Rodrigues, Luís (2011). Introduction to Reliable and Secure Distributed Programming. Springer. ISBN 9783642152597.
- Guerraoui, Rachid; Kapałka, Michał (2010). Principles of Transactional Memory. Synthesis Lectures on Distributed Computing Theory. Springer. doi:10.2200/s00253ed1v01y201009dct004. ISBN 978-3-031-00874-0. ISSN 2155-1626. S2CID 27967459.
- Besancenot, Jérôme; Cart, Michèle; Ferrié, Jean; Guerraoui, Rachid; Pucheral, Philippe; Traverson, Bruno (1997). Les systèmes transactionnels : Concepts, normes et produits (in French). Paris: Lavoisier-Hermès. ISBN 9782866016456.

He is also an associate (area) editor of the Journal of the ACM.

Guerraoui also works on the popularization of computer science. With his doctoral student El Mahdi El Mahmdi, he created the Wandida project, a collection of permissively licensed educational videos on YouTube.

Guerraoui maintains strong ties to Morocco through his participation in the public debate and the Moroccan political life. In December 2019, he was appointed by King Mohammed VI as a member of the Special Committee on Model of Development.

== Focal research areas and main publications ==
Guerraoui worked on establishing theoretical foundations of Transactional Memory (TM). He co-defined a concept he called opacity, used for establishing correctness of TMs. On the practical side, he co-devised elastic transactions and co-designed SwissTM, a throughput-efficient software transactional memory (STM) as well as a benchmark for TM systems, STMBench7.

Earlier, Guerraoui studied scalable information dissemination methods. His paper on lightweight epidemic broadcast was the first to consider the partial and/or out-of-sync views of different processes in a gossip-based distributed system. This paper, together with Guerraoui's paper on the underlying membership service, gained over 1250 citations combined as of 2018, among which a number of theory papers on the analysis of gossip protocols in realistic settings.

Rachid Guerraoui has a proven record of investigating the foundations of asynchronous distributed computations. For instance, Guerraoui co-established lower bounds for asynchronous gossiping and renaming. He further proved fundamental results on the relationships between classical distributed computing problems, such as atomic commitment and consensus, for which he helped close the then open problem of the weakest failure detector for consensus with any number of faults and co-established a new classification of distributed computing problems. Guerraoui further co-defined a general methodology to build highly concurrent asynchronous data structures and has shown how asynchrony can help build pseudo-random numbers.

Guerraoui invented the mathematical abstraction of indulgence to precisely capture the essence of asynchronous algorithms of which safety does not depend on timing assumptions, such as Lamport's Paxos or Castro-Liskov's PBFT. Guerraoui used that concept to co-define a general framework for secure and reliable distributed protocols.
