= Robert W. Lucky =

American engineer (1936–2022)

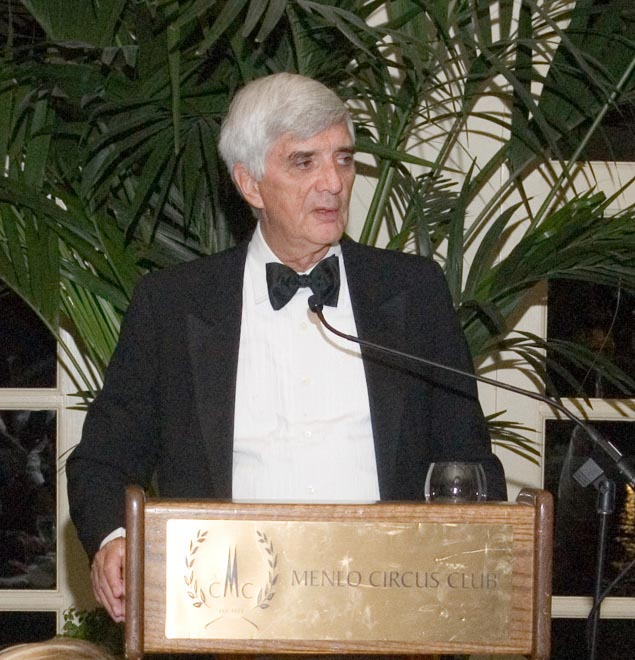
- Born: January 9, 1936; Pittsburgh, Pennsylvania
- Died: March 10, 2022 (aged 86); Fair Haven, New Jersey, U.S.
- Awards: Marconi Prize (1987); IEEE Edison Medal (1995); NAE (1978); IEEE Fellow (1972)

Robert Wendell Lucky (January 9, 1936 – March 10, 2022) was an American electrical engineer, inventor, and research manager at Bell Labs and Bell Communications Research (Bellcore). He is best known for his writings and speeches about technology, society, and engineering culture. Bob was a Fellow of the IEEE and a member of the National Academy of Engineering. He is also a member of TTI/Vanguard's advisory board.

== Early life ==
Robert Lucky was born in Pittsburgh, Pennsylvania, and went to high school in Mt. Lebanon, Pennsylvania. He studied electrical engineering at Purdue University, graduating with a BSEE in 1957. He stayed on at Purdue and earned an MSEE in 1959. Continuing at Purdue he did his PhD research under John C Hancock, writing a thesis on simultaneous amplitude modulated and phase modulated digital communication. In his thesis he derived two-dimensional signal constellations that are similar to those used in the quadrature amplitude modulation (QAM) systems commonly used in high speed digital communications today. He received his PhD from Purdue in 1961.

== Career ==
Lucky joined Bell Labs in 1961, where his initial assignment was in the data theory department under William R Bennett. In 1964 he made his best known invention, the adaptive equalizer, and in the years to follow he was promoted numerous times, becoming in 1982 the executive director of the communications sciences research division. This division comprised essentially all of the Bell Labs research on wireless, optical systems, and other communications systems topics, as well as some of the Bell Labs research on physics and computer science. Two Nobel Prizes were won by researchers in the division.

Lucky left Bell Labs in 1992 and joined Bellcore, the research laboratory for the divested Bell telephone companies, where he was corporate vice president, responsible for management of research. A few years later Bellcore was sold to Science Applications International Corporation (SAIC) and renamed Telcordia Technologies (today iconectiv). Robert Lucky retired from Telcordia in 2002.

== Adaptive equalizer ==
In the early 1960s the highest speed for modems on telephone lines was 2400 bits per second. Higher speeds were not possible because of intersymbol interference. Each dialed connection would have a different distorting effect on the series of pulses sent to convey digital information, smearing successive pulses and entangling them, resulting in errors in detection.

Lucky invented a way to adaptively undo the smearing effects by automatic adjustment of a variable filter, using a tapped delay line with adjustable gains at each tap. The equalizer used a steepest descent algorithm to minimize distortion. It was initially trained by a series of known pulses, but during actual data transmission it relied upon decision-directed adjustment, which assumed that decisions about pulses were largely correct and could be used for reconstruction of the ongoing error.

The first adaptive equalizer, in 1964, used 13 adjustable gains, each set by 8 relays. The rack of equipment was about 5 feet high. Its use immediately made possible data transmission at 9600 bits per second – four times the highest previously attainable speed.

Shortly thereafter, the relays were replaced with transistor switches, then in succeeding years the equalizer was implemented with a special purpose integrated circuit. Today adaptive equalization is built into almost every modem and is simply a subroutine in the instruction program for an embedded microprocessor.

== Advisory positions ==
Throughout his career, Lucky was heavily involved in advisory and participatory roles in engineering societies, universities, and government. In the IEEE he was editor of the Proceedings of the IEEE, president of the Communications Society, and executive vice president of the parent IEEE. His government service included being chairman of the United States Air Force Scientific Advisory Board, chairman of the Federal Communications Commission Technological Advisory Council, chairman of the statutory visiting committee of the National Institute of Standards and Technology, and membership on the Defense Science Board. He was active with the National Academy of Engineering and on the advisory boards of several universities.

== Honors and awards ==
Among his honors, Lucky was awarded four honorary doctorate degrees, the 1987 Marconi Prize, the 1995 IEEE Edison Medal, and the 1998 Golden Jubilee Award for Technological Innovation from the IEEE Information Theory Society. He was elected a member of the National Academy of Engineering for contributions to the theory and practical development of data communication systems. He was an elected member of the American Academy of Arts and Sciences and the European Academy of Sciences and Arts.

== Writings ==
Lucky was the author (with J Salz and EJ Weldon) of a textbook, Principles of Data Communications (McGraw-Hill, New York, 1965). He wrote a popularized account of information theory in Silicon Dreams (St Martins Press, New York, 1989).

After 1982 he wrote a bi-monthly column, Reflections, in IEEE Spectrum Magazine, which featured his essays on technology and engineering culture. A compilation of his essays was published under the title Lucky Strikes Again (Wiley/IEEE Press, 1992).

The May 1992 IEEE Spectrum Magazine published his parable of The Bean Counters.

== Later career ==
After retirement in 2002, Lucky was a member of the Defense Science Board, chairman of the board of ANSER, Inc., a member of the Laboratory Operations Board of the United States Department of Energy, chairman of Marconi Society, and a member of advisory board of TTI/Vanguard. The governor of New Jersey appointed him to the Authority for the Redevelopment of Fort Monmouth, and he was elected chairman of that Authority.
