= Martijn Koster =

Dutch software engineer

- Born: 1970 (age 55–56)
- Occupation: software engineer
- Known for: Aliweb, robots.txt

Martijn Koster (born ca 1970) is a Dutch software engineer noted for his pioneering work on Internet searching.

Koster created ALIWEB, the Internet's first search engine, which was announced in November 1993 while working at Nexor and presented in May 1994 at the First International Conference on the World Wide Web. Unlike contemporary crawler-based tools, ALIWEB did not use a robot to index the web; instead, website owners had to register their sites manually. This approach avoided the bandwidth problems that automated crawlers caused, but it also limited the service's growth, as many webmasters did not know how to create the required files. Koster also developed ArchiePlex, a search engine for FTP sites that pre-dates the Web, and CUSI, a simple tool that allowed you to search different search engines in quick succession, useful in the early days of search when services provided varying results.

Koster also created the Robots Exclusion Standard.
