= Comdial =

US telecommunications company

Comdial Corporation
- Company type: Public
- Industry: Telecommunications
- Founded: 1977
- Defunct: 2005
- Fate: Acquired
- Successor: Vertical Communications
- Headquarters: Sarasota, Florida, United States

Comdial Corporation was a telecommunications company based in Sarasota, Florida, and was headquartered in a former Lockheed plant building shared with L3 Communications. Because of the history of manufacturing at the facility, the grounds surrounding the site has been the subject of claims of environmental contamination, namely underground toxic chemicals.

== History ==
Comdial was founded in Oregon in 1977 as a telecommunications research firm. On October 1, 1982 it acquired the telephone manufacturing division of General Dynamics for $53.7 million, gaining the company a major product design and manufacturing operation located in Charlottesville, Virginia.

In the mid-1980s, Comdial supported an R&D facility in Bridgeport, Connecticut. Under the operating name of Scott Technologies, a large portion of the unused Remington Arms building complex was employed. ST developed LCR (Lowest Cost Routing) and station control hardware. Mainframe PBX computers were developed and a limited production facility produced Comdial telephones. The ST facility was closed in 1985-6 and several key engineering employees were offered positions at the Charlottesville, Virginia facility.

Throughout the 1990s Comdial was a large manufacturer of telecommunications equipment in the USA. After several mismanaged years when telecommunications services were in demand during the dot-com boom (1998–2001) and a brief frenetic attempt to sell directly to the consumer with a retail program in order to generate revenue, Comdial filed for Chapter 11 bankruptcy protection in May 2005. In September 2005, Comdial was acquired by Vertical Communications, which continued to sell the Comdial DX-120, FX II, and MP5000 systems under the name Vertical Comdial.

== Products ==
Comdial was a former manufacturer and designer of telecommunication systems. Some of Comdial's more popular discontinued products include the DSU and DSUII, the Concierge (marketed to hotel/motels), FXT/S, Unisyn, and the Comdial Digitech and Executech systems. Comdial sold most of their systems through wholesalers in the US such as Graybar Electric and Tech Data. Comdial also had a large network of Authorized Dealers that marketed the small telephone systems as well as the larger PBXs.

Refurbished Vertical MP5000 units (as of 2019) continue in the marketplace.
