= Noviforum =

Noviforum Ltd.
- Company type: Public
- Industry: Internet, software, databases
- Founded: Ljubljana, Slovenia (1994)
- Headquarters: Ljubljana, Slovenia, SLO
- Products: Najdi.si, Pogodak
- Number of employees: 65 (2007)
- Website: www.noviforum.si

Noviforum Ltd. is a Slovenian company that has its headquarters in Ljubljana, Slovenia. It has created the most popular search engine and portal in Slovenia called Najdi.si. It launched in April 2005.

== Products ==
- Interseek Technology: a search engine technology written in Java that has many features. One of them is a Google like ranking system. ( see PageRank ). For a full feature list, see here.
- IPIS: IPIS is a software, containing the biggest catalogue of various information of all Slovene business subjects (enterprises, organisations).
- IBON: iBON is a computer organized database of prudential reports and finance information gathered on a CD-ROM for Slovene businesses published since 1994.
- Najdi.si Map: much like Google Maps, only centered on Slovenia. If you want to see the map, see here.
- Najdi.si Free SMS: A tool that allows all Slovenians to send a limited number of free SMS messages per day. As of January 2012, the number of free SMSes is limited to 40.
