= AlltheWeb =

Internet search engine

- Screenshot of AlltheWeb
- Website type: Web search engine
- Launched: 1999; 27 years ago (as Fast)
- Current status: Closed, Shut down by Yahoo!

AlltheWeb (sometimes referred to as FAST or FAST Search) was an Internet search engine. It originated from FTP Search, the doctorate thesis project of Tor Egge at the Norwegian University of Science and Technology. Egge began the work in 1994, and it later led to the creation of Fast Search & Transfer (FAST), founded on July 16, 1997. AlltheWeb launched in mid-1999. It was acquired by Yahoo in 2003. Yahoo shut it down in 2011.

== Traits ==
When AlltheWeb started in 1999, FAST aimed to provide their database to other search engines, major portals, Internet service providers and content sites. By August 2, 1999, the AlltheWeb database had grown to 200 million unique URLs. By June 2002, their crawler had indexed over 2 billion pages.

AlltheWeb claimed a few advantages over Google, such as a fresher database, more advanced search features, search clustering and a completely customizable look.

== Closure ==
In February 2003, FAST's web search division was bought by Overture for $70 million. In July 2003, Overture was acquired by Yahoo!, putting AlltheWeb under the ownership of Yahoo!. Shortly after Yahoo!'s acquisition, the AlltheWeb site started using Yahoo!'s database and some of the advanced functions were removed, such as FTP search and direct image search.

In May 2006, Yahoo! started testing live search results on AlltheWeb.

On April 4, 2011, AlltheWeb was shut down by Yahoo!.

== See also ==
- List of search engines
