= Emina Torlak =

American computer scientist

Emina Torlak is an American computer scientist and software engineer whose research concerns software verification, program synthesis, and the integration of these techniques into domain-specific languages. She was previously professor of computer science at the University of Washington, and is currently a senior principal scientist for Amazon Web Services.

== Education and career ==
Torlak was educated in computer science at the Massachusetts Institute of Technology, earning a bachelor's degree in 2003, a master's degree in 2004, and completing her Ph.D. in 2009. Her dissertation, A constraint solver for software engineering: finding models and cores of large relational specifications, was supervised by Daniel Jackson.

She worked as a researcher for IBM Research, LogicBlox, and the University of California, Berkeley from 2008 to 2014, before becoming an assistant professor at the University of Washington in 2014. She was promoted to associate professor in 2018, and added an affiliation with Amazon Web Services in 2021.

== Recognition ==
Torlak was 2016 winner of the Junior Dahl–Nygaard Prize, "for her work on developing tools and methodologies to help build better software more easily". She was the 2021 winner of the ACM SIGPLAN Robin Milner Young Researcher Award, recognizing her as "a leader in the area of automated verification".
