= Database Center for Life Science =

Japanese research institute

Database Center for Life Sciences
- Established: 2007
- Director: Yuji Kohara
- Address: Univ. of Tokyo Kashiwa-no-ha Campus Station Satellite 6F. 178-4-4 Wakashiba, Kashiwa-shi, Chiba, JAPAN
- Location: Kashiwa and Mishima, Japan
- Coordinates: 35°53′41″N 139°57′09″E
- Interactive map of Database Center for Life Sciences
- Website: https://dbcls.rois.ac.jp/index-en.html

Database Center for Life Science (ライフサイエンス統合データベースセンター) or DBCLS, is a Japanese research institute and part of the Research Organization of Information and Systems. It was founded in 2007.

== BioHackathon ==
DBCLS has been organizing annual BioHackathon event since 2008 and co-organizing with National Bioscience Database Center (NBDC) since 2011. The main objective of the events is a development of technologies and resources which improves integration, preservation and utilization of databases in life sciences.

== Resources at the DBCLS ==
- Anatomography
