= Association Internationale pour les Technologies Objets =

- Formation: 1992; 34 years ago
- Founded at: Geneva
- Type: Nonprofit
- VAT ID no.: DE314594135
- Purpose: Promote the advancement of research in object-oriented technology, primarily in Europe
- Location: Queidersbach, Germany
- Subsidiaries: AITO Services GmbH
- Website: aito.org

The Association Internationale pour les Technologies Objets, also known as AITO, is a non-profit association to promote the advancement of research in object-oriented technology. Each year it awards the Dahl–Nygaard Prizes and beginning in 2016, The AITO Test of Time Award. It published The Journal of Object Technology. and is the official sponsor of the annual European Conference on Object-Oriented Programming.
