= Richard Wiener =

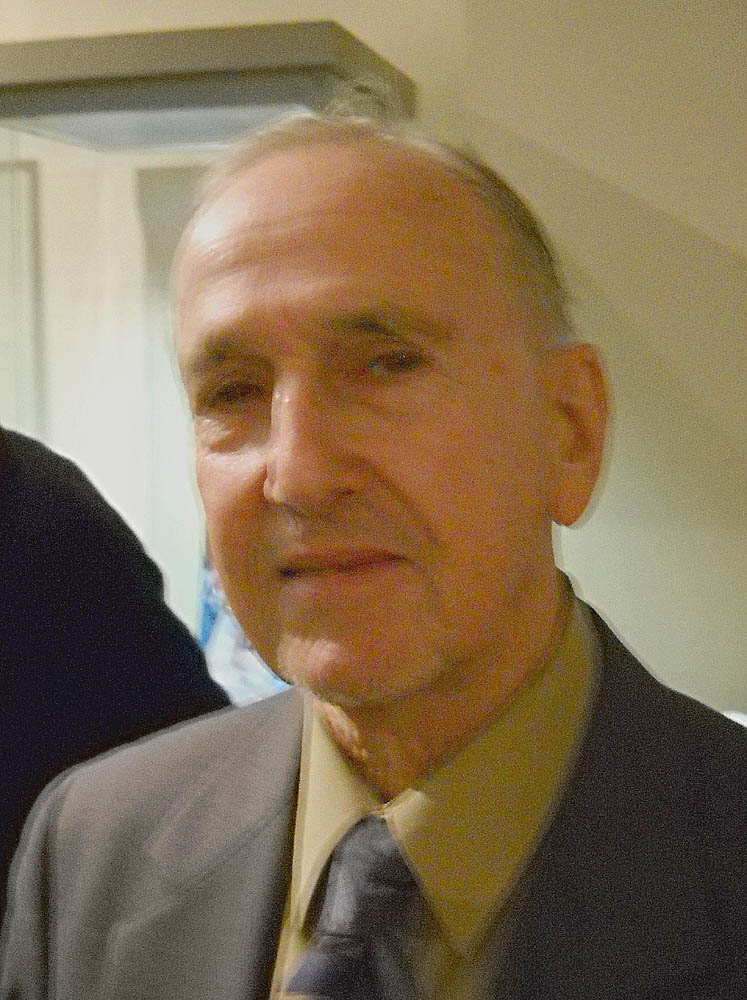
- Born: August 7, 1927 (age 99); Wittenberg, Germany
- Education: Columbia University (1950); Princeton Graduate School (1951); George Washington University Law School (1963)
- Occupation: patent attorney

Richard Wiener (born on August 7 , 1927 in Wittenberg) is a German-American patent attorney and honorary citizen of Lutherstadt Wittenberg.

== Childhood ==
The son of Wittenberg shoe manufacturer Robert Wiener (1900–1973) and his wife Mariem (née Glückmann), Wiener comes from a Jewish family that settled in Wittenberg following World War I. His grandfather Baruch Wiener built a shoe factory there, which his sons Robert and Max Wiener later took over. Richard Wiener led a comfortable life until the age of five. Then, in 1933, the year he started school, everything changed as the Nazi Party seized power in Germany. He soon felt the growing antisemitism in Germany, and in school he suffered from the effects of the Nuremberg Laws, which made life increasingly difficult for Jews in Germany. His parents therefore decided to apply to leave for the USA in 1936. In 1937, he transferred to the Melanchthon Gymnasium (preparatory high school), where he suffered at the hands of his classmates at a time when Jews were increasingly being excluded from public life in the city. The situation worsened following Kristallnacht: His father was arrested and the family's furniture was destroyed. During this period, his family lived in a virtual state of house arrest, deprived of all rights.

== Emigration to England ==
In early 1939, he was fortunate enough to emigrate to England as one of 10,000 children on the Kindertransport. He first stayed with relatives in London; then, when World War 2 broke out, he was moved to a small English town to keep him safe from air raids. In summer 1940, his family received the US visas they had longed for and moved to Brooklyn, where Wiener attended Brooklyn Technical High School before doing his military service with the U.S. Army. Following this service, he wandered around the Western United States for several months, working with the railroad system, at the Anaconda Foundry in Montana, and on plantations and ranches. In 1947, he began his studies at Columbia University, earning a Bachelor of Arts in 1950. He briefly studied at Princeton Graduate School in 1951, and in 1958, he began studying law at New York University Law School. At 32, his company offered him to manage a branch in Washington D.C., leading him to transfer to George Washington University Law School, where he earned his Bachelor of Laws in 1963. He then worked as an independent patent attorney and later became a senior associate at a law firm. He got married at age 39 and had a son and a daughter. The marriage ended after twenty years in divorce.

== Return to Wittenberg ==
Following several trips to the Federal Republic of Germany, he was finally able to visit his hometown again in 1990 following the fall of the Berlin Wall, observing with sadness how run-down the buildings had become. Wiener also began learning about the life stories of his former classmates. During a second visit to Wittenberg in 1993 to celebrate the 700th anniversary of the city's founding, he saw the changes that came about through German reunification. During this visit, he also met the president of Wittenberg University in Springfield, Ohio, for whom he interpreted during discussions to establish a student exchange between the American university and Martin Luther University Halle-Wittenberg. A Center for USA Studies was ultimately established at the Leucorea. He visited the town again in 1997 and met his former classmates. This discussion helped him to forgive those who brought so much suffering to him and his family. Following this experience, he organized a workshop in the United States with the motto Die Kraft des Vergebens (the power of forgiveness). He has since traveled to many states in the US and given talks about reconciliation and intercultural understanding.

== Honorary citizenship ==
In 2010, a majority decision was passed by the Wittenberg city council to make Wiener an honorary citizen for his diverse and outstanding services and achievements for the city of Lutherstadt Wittenberg. On October 3 of the same year, Lord Mayor Eckhard Naumann presented Wiener with his certificate of honorary citizenship during the 20th German Unity Day ceremony, stating that the city of Wittenberg was granting him its highest honor due to his work to promote reconciliation, but also as an apology for the injustice inflicted upon him in the past. "By promoting reconciliation and understanding, Wiener is serving as an ambassador of Wittenberg and displaying an attitude that is of vital importance for the city's image."

== Bibliography ==
- Richard Wiener: Der Nutzen der Not. In: Heimatkalender 2004 der Lutherstadt Wittenberg und Landkreis Wittenberg. Drei Kastanien Verlag, Wittenberg, 2004, ISBN 978-3-933028-78-5, vol. 7, p. 46.
- Richard Wiener: Mein Vater, der KZ Insasse. In: Heimatkalender 2005 der Lutherstadt Wittenberg und Landkreis Wittenberg. Drei Kastanien Verlag, Wittenberg, 2005, ISBN 978-3-933028-88-4, p. 36.
- Richard Wiener: Rückkehr aus dem Exil. In: Heimatkalender 2006 der Lutherstadt und Landkreis Wittenberg. Drei Kastanien Verlag, Wittenberg, 2006, ISBN 978-3-933028-96-9, vol. 9, p. 63.
- Die Neue Brücke – Das Amtsblatt der Lutherstadt Wittenberg. September 10, 2010, vol. 17, no. 18, p. 7, decision no.: I/158-14-10.
- Wolfgang Gorsboth: Botschafter der Versöhnung – Ehrenbürgerwürde am Tag der deutschen Einheit. In: Wochenspiegel – Die Wochenzeitung für Wittenberg, Jessen und Gräfenhainichen. Wochenspiegel-Verlags-Gesellschaft, Wittenberg, 2010, vol. 20, no. 38, September 22, 2010, pp. 1, 3.
- Stephanie Hommers: Heilender Akt für beide Seiten. In: Mitteldeutsche Zeitung – Elbe Kurier. October 4, 2010, p. 10.
- Laudatio von Mario Dittrich für Richard Wiener. In: Heimatkalender 2011 der Lutherstadt Wittenberg und Landkreis Wittenberg. Drei Kastanien Verlag, Wittenberg, 2011, p. 28.
- Bemerkungen bei der Verleihung des Ehrenbürgerrechts von Richard Wiener. In: Heimatkalender 2011 der Lutherstadt Wittenberg und Landkreis Wittenberg. Drei Kastanien Verlag, Wittenberg, 2011, p. 32.
