= LANtastic =

Personal computer networking system

LANtastic was a peer-to-peer local area network (LAN) operating system for DOS and Microsoft Windows (and formerly OS/2). The New York Times described the network, which permits machines to function both as servers and as workstations, as allowing computers, "to share printers and other devices."

InformationWeek pointed out that "these peer-to-peer networking solutions, such as Webcorp's Web and Artisoft's LANtastic, definitely aren't powerful, but they can act as 'starter' local area networks" yet added that even Fortune-sized companies find them useful.

LANtastic supports Ethernet, ARCNET and Token Ring adapters as well as its original twisted-pair adapter at 2 Mbit/s.

== Overview ==
Lantastic networks use NetBIOS.

Its multi-platform support allows a LANtastic client station to access any combination of Windows or DOS operating systems, and its interconnectivity allows sharing of files, printers, CD-ROMs and applications throughout an enterprise. LANtastic was especially popular before Windows 95 arrived with built-in networking and was nearly as popular as the market leader Novell at the time.

The New York Times described the network, which permits machines to function both as servers and as workstations, as allowing computers "to share printers and other devices.

== History ==
LANtastic was originally developed by Artisoft, Inc. in Tucson, Arizona, the first company to offer peer-to-peer networking.

Several foreign-language versions were released in 1992.

By mid 1994, Microsoft's Windows for Workgroups was "eating into" LANtastic's lead (as was Novell).

Artisoft bought TeleVantage, and renamed the latter Artisoft TeleVantage. Artisoft subsequently bought Vertical Communications (September, 2004), and renamed itself (January, 2005) to be Vertical Communications.

Following the release of TeleVantage, Lantastic and Artisoft's other legacy products were acquired by SpartaCom Technologies in 2000. SpartaCom was later acquired by PC Micro.

LANtastic 8.01 was released in 2006. It can connect PCs running MS-DOS (also PC DOS) 5.0 or later and Windows 3.x up to 7 (in case of Windows XP and 7, some limitations apply).

LANtastic is no longer supported or produced as of 2010.

== Reception ==
In 1989, BYTE magazine listed LANtastic as among the "Distinction" winners of the BYTE Awards, stating that the $399 starter kit with two cards was "a lot of LAN for the buck" and noting that columnist Jerry Pournelle used it "despite the silly name".

Artisoft products were described in 1994 as "popular with small businesses." By 1996 they were able to buy the 1991-founded Stylus Innovation for $12.8 million.

== Line extensions ==
In 1993 the company introduced a pair of line extensions named:

- Simply LANtastic, "for beginners" (with licensing for 2 - 10 peer-to-peer nodes) and
- LANtastic Power Suite came with Lotus Organizer and Cheyenne's backup software.

=== Lantastic-95 ===
A package named Lantastic-95 was designed to give more security than the Windows 95 "signon" screen (for which pressing ESCape is the way to bypass it) and also support "long name" files.

Artisoft also announced plans for a dedicated-server version of the flagship LANtastic product.

This was known as Corestream.

A Lantastic NLM running on a Novell 4.01 core

== See also ==
- Novell NetWare Lite / Personal NetWare
