= Vertical Communications =

Vertical Communications, Inc.
- Type: Public
- Traded as: OTCID Basic: VRCC
- Industry: Telecommunications
- Founded: 1982; 44 years ago
- Headquarters: Santa Clara, California, United States
- Key people: Bill Tauscher (CEO, CFO, Chairman); Peter Bailey, President and COO
- Products: Software PBX; business telephone systems; IP-PBX
- Website: vertical.com

Vertical Communications, Inc. is a corporation that specialized in premises-based private branch exchanges, i.e., business telephone systems. Vertical Communications changed its name on January 1, 2005 from Artisoft, Inc. after acquiring Vertical Networks in September 2004. In September 2005, Vertical Communications acquired Comdial. On December 1, 2006, Vodavi Technology was acquired by Vertical Communications.

As of 2018/2019, limited products could be purchased of refurbished units from equipment brokers.

== Partner programs ==
Vertical sells almost exclusively through a value-added reseller (VAR) channel.

== History ==
=== Artisoft ===
Logo of Artisoft, Inc.

Tucson, Arizona-based Artisoft was the first company to offer peer-to-peer networking. The name of its network operating system was LANtastic.

In 1996 the company acquired Stylus Innovation for $12.8 million. Stylus Innovation, noted for its Barcode-based remote shopping product, was founded in 1991 by Krisztina 'Z' Holly, Mike Cassidy and John Barrus.

Stylus Innovation came to public attention by winning the Grand-Prize in the 1991 MIT $100K Entrepreneurship Competition.

=== Legacy ===
Artisoft bought TeleVantage, and renamed the latter Artisoft TeleVantage. However, with Microsoft's Windows for Workgroups "eating into" LANtastic's lead (as was Novell). and then free "bundled networking software" in Windows 95 and 98, the company "saw the handwriting on the wall."

LANtastic's originator, Artisoft Televantage, sold "Legacy" technology ("LANtastic") to Spartacom Technologies in 2000. The latter, which subsequently was acquired by PC Micro, continued to market and maintain LANtastic. Version 8.01, released in 2006, can network PCs running MS-DOS (also PC DOS) 5.0 or later and Windows 3.x up to 7.

=== Vertical redirect ===
In September 2004 Artisoft, minus its former LANtastic technology, purchased Vertical and, effective January 2005, renamed itself Vertical Communications Inc.

Vertical now had two non-competing main products, Televantage (for firms with under 1,000 phones and "one or more locations" and Vertical's "own" InstantOffice, "a Voice-over-IP phone system ... for large enterprises with many locations."
