= Yahoo Native =

Internet advertising service provided by Yahoo

Yahoo! Native
- Formerly: Overture (2001–2003); Yahoo! Search Marketing (2003–2009); Yahoo! Advertising (2009–2014); Yahoo! Gemini (2014–2017)
- Type: subsidiary
- Industry: Internet
- Founded: 1997; 29 years ago
- Headquarters: Sunnyvale, California, U.S.
- Parent: Yahoo!
- Website: gemini.yahoo.com

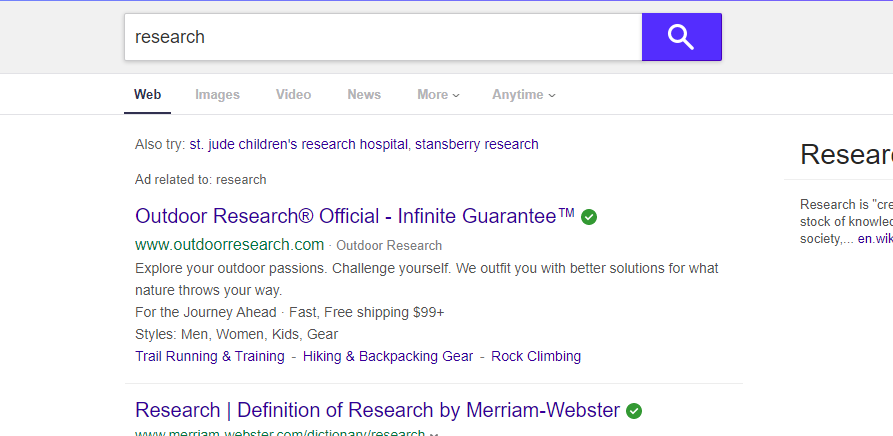
YahooSearchAd

Yahoo! Native (formerly known as Yahoo! Advertising, Yahoo! Search Marketing and Yahoo! Gemini) is a native "Pay per click" Internet advertising service provided by Yahoo.

Yahoo began offering this service after acquiring Overture Services, Inc. The current offering of Yahoo Native launched in 2014 as Yahoo! Gemini. It handles advertising for both Yahoo and AOL properties, as well as other media outlets.

== History ==
=== GoTo and Overture ===
GoTo main page in 1998

GoTo (not to be confused with Go.com or Go2Net) was an Idealab spin off and was the first company to successfully provide a pay-for-placement search service. It started off with the purchase of World Wide Web Worm (WWWW), one of the oldest search engines. GoTo is considered to have been an influential pioneer of paid search.

In February 1998, GoTo offered advertisers the option of bidding on how much they would be willing to pay to appear at the top of results in response to specific searches. The bid amount was paid by the advertiser to GoTo every time a searcher clicked on a link to the advertiser's website. By July 1998, advertisers were paying anything up to a dollar per click. In June 1999, GoTo launched a tool set direct traffic centre (dtc) to enable advertisers access to keywords and real time bidding.

GoTo's business model was based on the idea that its paid listings would make it more relevant than other services, especially for general searches, and web sites that pay more are probably better sites. A similar service had been offered by Open Text in 1996, but this precipitated outcries and bad publicity because searchers at the time did not want the search process more commercialized.

In contrast, GoTo's pay-for-placement model was very successful. Commenters theorized that the Internet had matured in the intervening two years, and this type of economic models were more acceptable since the web was no longer just a place for academic research, but also a place for buying products. GoTo founder Bill Gross speculated at the launch that GoTo would succeed because, as a relatively new service, it had no reputation to taint with paid listings, unlike Open Text.

On October 8, 2001, GoTo renamed itself Overture Services, Inc. GoTo's chief operating officer Jaynie Studenmund, mother of fallen U.S. soldier Scott Studenmund, said, "We also felt it was a sophisticated enough name, in case our products expand."

Through partnerships, Overture enabled portals such as MSN and Yahoo to monetize the hundreds of millions of web searches made each day on their sites. Indeed, these partnerships proved highly lucrative, and in a period otherwise marked by dot-com failures, Overture became a substantial profit driver for portals like Yahoo

This success enabled Overture to acquire web sites such as AltaVista and AlltheWeb.

=== Acquisition of Overture by Yahoo! ===
On October 7, 2003, Overture was acquired by its biggest customer, Yahoo!, for $1.63 billion. The old brand name of Overture was phased out as Yahoo rebranded many of its products under the Yahoo name. The exception to this was in Japan and Korea where the local businesses continued to use the Overture brand.

=== Panama ===
Panama was an online advertising platform created by Yahoo!, launched on 5 February 2007. Panama was Yahoo's effort to close the wide gap with Google in the race for search advertising dollars, a fast-growing business then dominated by Google, which is now also dominated by Google. Customers with accounts already on Yahoo! were transferred to the new system over the following few months. Yahoo! inherited the search advertising business when it purchased Overture (previously named Goto.com). Until Panama, Yahoo! search continued to operate the original simplistic algorithm which ranked text ads according to how much advertisers bid for the keyword searched by the user. Meanwhile, Google operates under a more sophisticated model, which ranks paid ads on the basis of bid price as well as prior click-through rates. This improvement generally produces higher click through rates (hence higher revenues) for the search engine. This also allowed Yahoo to control the pricing of ad auctions rather than having the auctions operate at market value.

For example, an ambulance-chasing attorney bidding for the keywords "back pain" would likely get a lower clickthrough rate than the keyword "physiotherapist", regardless of what the two parties bid per click. An algorithm that eventually de-prioritizes the attorney's ad is better for the search engine (in terms of revenue produced) and the user (more relevant ads).

Key players in the Panama project were Brian Acton, David Henke & Qi Lu.

==== Features ====
The platform provided advertisers with a digital dashboard where they can manage their marketing campaigns, aim ads geographically, and test their effectiveness. It included interactive tools that suggest to advertisers what to bid based on their budget and the number of users they want to attract.

=== Yahoo Gemini ===
Logo (2009-2013)

Logo (2013-2014 Gemini launch)

During the tenure of Marissa Mayer as Yahoo's CEO she started a new advertising platform project under the name Gemini. The goal was to build a native advertising solution, where the ads take on the format of the content they accompany.

The so-called "quality index" gave advertisers a sense of how the system would rank an ad along with sophisticated analytical tools that gave advertisers insights on why certain campaigns had been effective.

== Patent litigation ==
In May 1999, GoTo filed a patent application titled "System and method for influencing a position on a search result list generated by a computer network search engine", which was granted as in July 2001. A related patent has also been granted in Australia and other patent applications remain pending.

Prior to its acquisition by Yahoo, Overture initiated infringement proceedings under this patent against FindWhat.com in January 2002 and Google in April 2002.

The lawsuit against Google related to its AdWords service. In February 2002, Google introduced a service called AdWords Select that allowed marketers to bid for higher placement in marked sections - a tactic that had some similarities to Overture's search-listing auctions.

Following Yahoo's acquisition of Overture, the lawsuit was settled with Google agreeing to issue 2.7 million shares of common stock to Yahoo in exchange for a perpetual license.

== Trademark issues ==
In 2013, the Tenth Circuit Court of Appeals held in Lens.com, Inc. v. 1-800 Contacts, Inc. that online contact lens seller Lens.com did not commit trademark infringement when it purchased Yahoo and Google AdWords search advertisements using competitor 1-800 Contacts' federally registered 1800 CONTACTS trademark as a keyword. In August 2016, the Federal Trade Commission filed an administrative complaint against 1-800 Contacts alleging, among other things, that its search advertising trademark enforcement practices have unreasonably restrained competition in violation of the FTC Act. 1-800 Contacts has denied all wrongdoing and was scheduled to appear before an FTC administrative law judge in April 2017.

== Adware partnership ==
In April 2003, Overture announced a three-year partnership with Gator Corporation, (now Claria Corporation) an adware company. Under the partnership, Gator's software monitored a web-user's activity on web sites and search engines (even sites such as Google that are not affiliated with Overture) and grabbed search keywords. These keywords were submitted to the Overture search engine. As a result, advertisers who paid for listings in Overture found their products advertised through Gator's Search Scout software, even if they wanted nothing to do with Gator. Overture faced a great deal of criticism for entering into this partnership.

When Yahoo acquired Overture, the Claria software impaired the operation of Yahoo's services. For example, when a user with a Claria application installed used Yahoo Search, they received a standard set of Yahoo results with sponsored listings at the top supplied by Overture. The user would then receive a full-screen pop-under window from Search Scout. Since Search Scout uses Overture's paid listings as well, Claria's window has exactly the same listings as the Yahoo search results.

Subsequently, Yahoo came out with the Yahoo Toolbar, which allows users to remove adware and spyware from their system. The toolbar affected the operation of Claria's software and may have put stress on the relationship between the two companies.

== See also ==
- Ad serving
- Google AdWords
- List of search engines
- Microsoft adCenter
- Pay per click
- Search engine marketing
