= Nan-Wei Gong =

Engineer

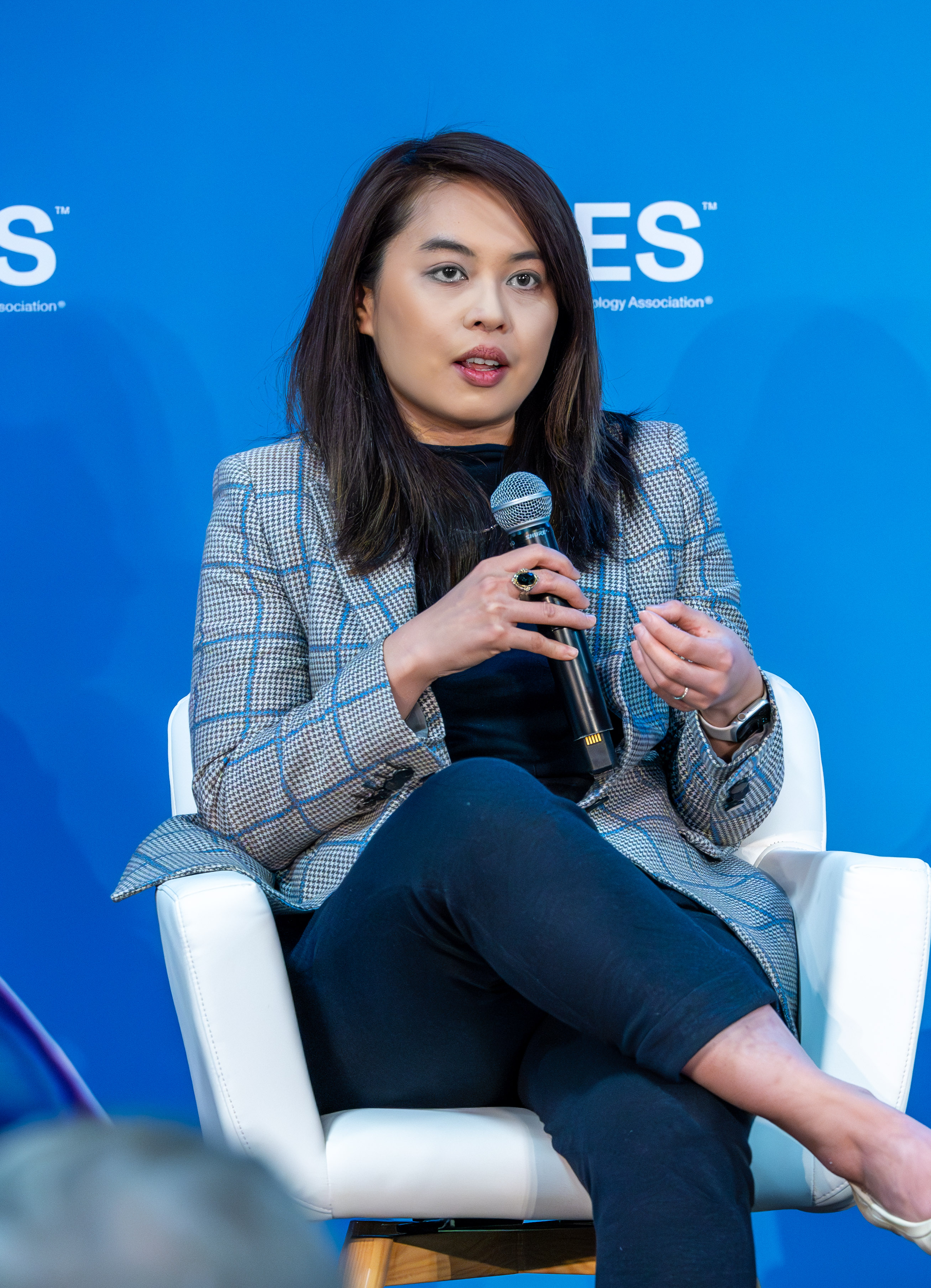
- Gong in 2025
- Born: Taiwan
- Education: National Tsing Hua University (BS, MS); Massachusetts Institute of Technology (MS, PhD)
- Employer: CEO of FIGUR8
- Awards: Robert P. Goldberg grand prize at Massachusetts Institute of Technology's $100K Entrepreneurship Competition
- Scientific career
- Fields: Materials science
- Thesis: Design and applications of inkjet-printed flexible sensate surfaces (2013)
- Website: https://www.figur8tech.com

Nan-Wei Gong is a Taiwanese-American materials scientist and entrepreneur whose work focuses on wearable technology. She is the founder and CEO of FIGUR8, a company focused on better technologies and hardware platforms to diagnose and treat musculoskeletal and orthopedic injuries.

== Early life and education ==
Gong was born and raised in Taiwan, where she graduated from National Tsing Hua University with a bachelor's degree and a master's degree in materials science and engineering. She then pursued further graduate studies in the United States at the Massachusetts Institute of Technology (MIT), where she earned a Master of Science (M.S.) in 2009 and her Ph.D. in media arts and sciences in 2013. Her doctoral dissertation, completed at the MIT Media Lab under Joseph Paradiso, was titled, "Design and pplications of inkjet-printed flexible sensate surfaces".

In 2013 Gong was part of a team that won the Robert P. Goldberg $100,000 grand prize at Massachusetts Institute of Technology's $100K Entrepreneurship Competition. The team created "new sensor-level software that recognizes three-dimensional gestures on small, battery-powered, mobile devices." Gong worked in MIT's Media Lab as a research assistant for seven years.

== Career ==
Gong founded Circular2, a technology consulting company in 2014. Gong is a co-inventor of a device for "sensing floor for locating people and devices. A patent was issued to Microsoft for this invention in 2015. Gong co-founded FIGUR8, a company that develops wearable technology that can assess the musculoskeletal system in minutes. This technology allows for better accessibility and visibility of soft-tissue recovery and treatment planning compared to MRI's and X-Ray scans.
