= The Journal of Object Technology =

Journal of Object Technology
- Discipline: Object-oriented programming
- Language: English
- Edited by: Alfonso Pierantonio

Publication details
- History: May 2002–present
- Publisher: AITO (Germany)
- Open access: Yes
- License: Creative Commons license

Standard abbreviations
- ISO 4: J. Object Technol.

Indexing
- ISSN: 1660-1769

Links
- Journal homepage

Open Access logo PLoS white

The Journal of Object Technology is an online scientific journal welcoming manuscripts describing theoretical, empirical, conceptual, and experimental results in the area of software and language engineering, including

- programming paradigms
- software language engineering
- model-based and model-driven engineering
- requirement engineering
- software architecture
- software validation & verification
- software maintenance and evolution
- software analytics
- software development process and methodology

Each issue contains columns by regular columnists and peer-reviewed papers. Columnists include Dave Thomas, Won Kim, Bertrand Meyer and John McGregor. Its first issue appeared in May 2002, in response to the need for an international journal covering the object-oriented and component-based development field. From 1986 to 2001, the Journal of Object-Oriented Programming played much of that role, but after it was sold to a new owner in 2000, it was announced in the following year that it would cease publication at the end of the year. The launching of The Journal of Object Technology was largely a response to this event, as leaders from the community realized a flagship publication was needed. Since then the journal evolved by broadening its audience.

== Platinum open access ==
The Journal of Object Technology is open-access and completely free to both readers and authors ("platinum" model). This model has been adopted since the journal's visionary creation in 2002 and applies to all contributions (available under the Creative Commons license). If you are interested in the journal's view on open access and in understanding what are the pros and cons of the different open access models you can have a look at the following editorial Open Access: all you wanted to know and never dared to ask.

== Continuous publication scheme ==
The Journal of Object Technology uses a continuous publication scheme whereby regular papers, upon acceptance, are immediately added into a dynamic annual issue, with final DOI and other metadata.

== Indexing ==
The journal has been indexed by DBLP, Google Scholar, Microsoft Academic Search, Scirus, ScientificCommons, Index of IS Journals, and Scopus. It is registered under ISSN 1660-1769.

== Masthead ==
=== Editor-in-chief ===
- Alfonso Pierantonio, Università degli Studi dell'Aquila, Italy

=== Deputy editor-in-chief ===
- Mark van den Brand, Technical University of Eindhoven, The Netherlands
- Benoit Combemale, University of Rennes, France

=== Special theme editor ===
- Richard Paige, McMaster University, Canada

=== Founder ===
- Bertrand Meyer, then at ETH Zurich, Switzerland

=== Founding editor emeritus ===
- Richard Wiener, University of Colorado at Colorado Springs, US

=== Steering committee ===
- Bertrand Meyer, Constructor Institute, Switzerland and Eiffel Software, Santa Barbara
- Oscar Nierstrasz, University of Bern, Switzerland
- Richard Paige, McMaster University, Canada
- Antonio Vallecillo, University of Malaga, Spain
- Jan Vitek, Northeastern University, US

=== Editorial board ===
- Antonia Bertolino, CNR ISTI, Italy
- Tony Clark, Aston University, Italy
- Juan de Lara, Universidad Autònoma de Madrid, Spain
- Davide Di Ruscio, Università degli Studi dell'Aquila, Italy
- Jürgen Dingel, Queen's University, Canada
- Stéphane Ducasse, INRIA, France
- Sebastien Erdweg, Johannes Gutenberg University Mainz, Germany
- Görel Hedin, Lund University, Sweden
- Zhenjian Hu, Peking University, China
- Jörg Kienzle, McGill University, Canada
- Jean-Marc Jézéquel, IRISA, France
- Doug Lea, State University of New York at Oswego, US
- Gary Leavens, University of Central Florida, USA
- Kim Mens, Université Catholique de Louvain, Belgium
- James Noble, Victoria University of Wellington, New Zealand
- David Naumann, Stevens Institute of Technology, USA
- Houari Sahraoui, Université de Montréal, Canada
- Michael Stal, Rijksuniversiteit Groningen, The Netherlands
- Perdita Stevens, University of Edinburgh, UK
- Antonio Vallecillo, University of Malaga, Spain
- Daniel Varro, McGill University/BME, Canada/Hungary
- Eelco Visser, Delft University of Technology, The Netherlands
- Jan Vitek, Northeastern University, USA
- Philip Wadler, University of Edinburgh, UK
- Manuel Wimmer, Johannes Kepler Universität Linz, Austria
- Elena Zucca, University of Genoa, Italy
