= Direct Hit Technologies =

Direct Hit Technologies, Inc. was a Boston-based search engine company that provided search engine services to major web portals and operated a public search engine at directhit.com. Founded in April 1998 by Gary Culliss and Mike Cassidy, the Direct Hit search engine utilized the anonymous searching activity of millions of web searchers to rank web sites based on a number of patented algorithms, such as how long searchers spent viewing each web page and where a site was ranked in the original search results list. The Direct Hit search engine technology was invented by Gary Culliss and is the subject of the following US Patents: US Pat. 6,006,222, US Pat. 6,078,916 and US Pat. 6,014,665 all entitled "Method for organizing information." Direct Hit filed to go public through Robertson Stephens in late 1999, and was acquired by Ask Jeeves in January 2002.

== See also ==
- List of search engines
- Index (search engine)
- Web indexing
- Web search query
