= JumpStation =

Early internet search engine

Jump Station
- Website type: Web search engine
- Available in: English
- Owner: Jonathon Fletcher
- Launched: 12 December 1993; 32 years ago
- Current status: Defunct/Closed 1994

JumpStation was the first WWW search engine that behaved, and appeared to the user, the way current web search engines do. It started indexing on 12 December 1993 and was announced on the Mosaic "What's New" webpage on 21 December 1993. It was hosted at the University of Stirling in Scotland.

It was written by Jonathon Fletcher, from Scarborough, England, who graduated from the university with a first class honours degree in Computing Science in the summer of 1992 and has subsequently been called the "father of the search engine".

He was later employed at the university as a systems administrator. JumpStation's development was discontinued when he left in late 1994, having failed to persuade investors, including the university, to provide financial backing. At this point the database had 275,000 entries spanning 1,500 servers.

JumpStation used document titles and headings to index the web pages found using a simple linear search, and did not provide any ranking of results. However, JumpStation had the same basic shape as Google Search in that it used an index solely built by a web robot, searched this index using keyword queries entered by the user on a web form whose location was well known, and presented its results in the form of a list of URLs that matched those keywords.

The story of JumpStation's origin and development was written up, using interviews with Fletcher, by Wishart and Bochsler in 2003.

== Nominations ==
JumpStation was nominated for a "Best Of The Web" award in 1994.
