= Gary Culliss =

American entrepreneur

Gary Culliss (born 1970) is an American entrepreneur who has founded several technology companies, including the search engine company Direct Hit Technologies and the interactive voice telecommunications company, SoundBite Communications (NASDAQ: SDBT).

== Biography ==
Culliss grew up in Overland Park, Kansas and has a degree in mechanical engineering from the University of South Florida, a Juris Doctor degree from Harvard Law School and an MBA in finance from the Wharton School at The University of Pennsylvania. He currently lives with his wife and four children in Rye, New Hampshire.

== Patents ==
Culliss holds a number of patents relating to computer and telephony systems, including US Pat. 6,006,222, US Pat. 6,078,916 and US Pat. 6,014,665 all entitled "Method for organizing information," as well as US Pat. 6,785,363 entitled "Voice message delivery method and system" and US Pat. 7,054,419 entitled "Answering machine detection for voice message delivery method and system."
