= Kathleen Sienko =

American biomechanical engineer

Kathleen Helen Sienko is an American biomechanical engineer whose expertise includes balance and balance-related physical therapy. Her other research interests include "sensory augmentation, rehabilitation engineering, biomechanics, medical device design (emphasis on global health contexts and task-shifting devices), and engineering design education". She is an Arthur F. Thurnau Professor in the Departments of Mechanical and Biomedical Engineering at the University of Michigan, and co-founder of the university's Center for Socially Engaged Engineering & Design.

== Education and career ==
Sienko majored in materials engineering at the University of Kentucky, where she graduated in 1998. She then went to the Massachusetts Institute of Technology (MIT) for a 2000 master's degree in aeronautics and astronautics. She completed a Ph.D. in medical engineering and bioastronautics in 2007, through the Harvard–MIT Program in Health Sciences and Technology.

Sienko joined the University of Michigan as an assistant professor in 2007, jointly in the Departments of Mechanical and Biomedical Engineering. She was promoted as an associate professor, and tenured in the Department of Mechanical Engineering, in 2013, and promoted to full professor in 2019. She founded the Center for Socially Engaged Engineering & Design in 2014, and served as its co-director until 2017.

== Recognition ==
Sienko received a National Science Foundation CAREER Award in 2009, for her research integrating haptic feedback into balance therapy.

The University of Michigan gave Sienko the 2012 Provost's Teaching Innovation Prize, for her work on a capstone engineering program that connected student medical device designs with the needs of medical professionals in developing and resource-limited parts of the world. At the University of Michigan, Sienko was named as a Miller Faculty Scholar in 2013. She was given the Arthur F. Thurnau Professorship in 2016, in recognition of her teaching excellence, commitment to learning, and contributions to undergraduate education.

Sienko was named as an ASME Fellow in 2026.
