= Gul Agha (computer scientist) =

American computer scientist

- Born: Sindh, Pakistan
- Education: California Institute of Technology; University of Michigan
- Known for: actor model + programming languages, statistical model checking
- Spouse: Jennifer S. Cole
- Awards: Fellow of the IEEE, Fellow of the ACM
- Scientific career
- Fields: Computer science
- Workplaces: University of Illinois at Urbana-Champaign
- Thesis: Actors: A Model of Concurrent Computing in Distributed Systems (1985)
- Doctoral advisor: John Holland, Carl Hewitt
- Website: osl.cs.illinois.edu/members/agha.html

Gul Agha (Sindhi: گل آغا ) is a professor of computer science at the University of Illinois at Urbana-Champaign, and director of the Open Systems Laboratory. He is known for his work on the actor model of concurrent computation, and was also Editor-in-Chief of ACM Computing Surveys from 1999 to 2007. Agha was born and completed his early schooling in Sindh, Pakistan. Agha completed his B.S. with honors at the California Institute of Technology in the year 1977. He received his Ph.D. in Computer and Communication Science from the University of Michigan in 1986 under the supervision of John Holland. However, much of his doctoral research was carried out in Carl Hewitt's Message-Passing Semantics Group at Massachusetts Institute of Technology (MIT). Agha's dissertation was published by the MIT Press as Actors: a model of concurrent computation in distributed systems, a book which, according to the ACM Guide to Computing Literature, has been cited over 3000 times.

== Interests ==
Agha enjoys Blues music and is a vegan and a pacifist. He has three daughters, including filmmaker Sindha Agha and Leila Agha a health economist, and lives with his wife Jennifer S. Cole in Illinois.

== Awards ==
Agha became a Fellow of the Institute of Electrical and Electronics Engineers (IEEE) in 2002. He is also a Golden Core Member of the IEEE Computer Society, and a recipient of the IEEE Computer Society Meritorious Service Award, and was an International Lecturer for the ACM from 1992 to 1997. Agha was elected as an ACM Fellow in 2018 for "research in concurrent programming and formal methods, specifically the Actor Model".

== See also ==
- Agent-based modeling
- SALSA (programming language)
