= World Wide Web Worm =

Early internet search engine

The World Wide Web Worm (WWWW) was one of the earliest search engines for the World Wide Web (WWW). It was developed in September 1993 by Oliver McBryan at the University of Colorado as a research project. It is claimed by some to be the first search engine, though it was not released until March 1994, by which time a number of other search engines had been made publicly available. It is the first web search engine known to include anchor text in its document index and search algorithms.

The worm created a database of 300,000 multimedia objects which could be obtained or searched for keywords via the WWW. It indexed about 110,000 webpages as of 1994. In contrast to present-day search engines, the WWWW featured support for Perl regular expressions.

The website, http://www.cs.colorado.edu/home/mcbryan/WWWW.html, is no longer accessible (archive). Circa 1997 Goto.com purchased WWWW's technology. McBryan stated in a 2016 podcast that WWWW was an educational project and he never thought of commercializing it like Excite or Yahoo! did, partly because the University did not have a department that dealt specifically with such computer technology.
