= David Watt (computer scientist) =

British computer scientist

- Born: 5 November 1946 (age 79)
- Scientific career
- Fields: Computer Science
- Institutions: University of Glasgow

David Anthony Watt (born 5 November 1946) is a British computer scientist.

Watt is a professor at the University of Glasgow, Scotland. With Peter Mosses he developed action semantics, a combination of denotational semantics, operational and algebraic semantics. He currently teaches a third year programming languages course, and a postgraduate course on algorithms and data structures. He is recognisable around campus for his more formal attire compared to the department's normally casual dress code.
