= Peter Mosses =

British computer scientist

- Born: 1948 (age 77–78)
- Scientific career
- Thesis: Mathematical Semantics and Compiler Generation (1975)
- Doctoral advisor: Christopher Strachey; Dana Scott
- Doctoral students: Bartosz Klin
- Website: pdmosses.github.io

Peter David Mosses (born 1948) is a British computer scientist.

Peter Mosses studied mathematics as an undergraduate at Trinity College, Oxford, and went on to undertake a DPhil supervised by Christopher Strachey in the Programming Research Group while at Wolfson College, Oxford in the early 1970s. He was the last student to submit his thesis under Strachey before Strachey's death.

In 1978, Mosses published his compiler-compiler, the Semantic Implementation System (SIS), which uses a denotational semantics description of the input language.

Mosses has spent most of his career at BRICS in Denmark. He returned to a chair at Swansea University, Wales. His main contribution has been in the area of formal program semantics. In particular, with David Watt he developed action semantics, a combination of denotational, operational and algebraic semantics.

Currently, Mosses is a visitor at TU Delft, working with the Programming Languages Group.
