= Fundamental Concepts in Programming Languages =

Notes for an influential 1967 lecture by Christopher Strachey

Fundamental Concepts in Programming Languages were an influential set of lecture notes written by Christopher Strachey for the International Summer School in Computer Programming at Copenhagen in August 1967. It introduced much programming language terminology still in use today, including "R-value" and "L-value", "ad hoc polymorphism", "parametric polymorphism", and "referential transparency".

The lecture notes were reprinted in 2000 in a special issue of Higher-Order and Symbolic Computation in memory of Strachey.

== Bibliography ==
- Mosses, Peter D. (2000). "A Foreword to 'Fundamental Concepts in Programming Languages'". Higher-Order and Symbolic Computation. 13 (1–2): 7–9. doi:10.1023/A:1010048229036. S2CID 39258759.
- Strachey, Christopher (1967). Fundamental Concepts in Programming Languages (Technical report). Lecture notes for the International Summer School in Computer Programming at Copenhagen. Also: Strachey, Christopher (2000). "Fundamental Concepts in Programming Languages". Higher-Order and Symbolic Computation. 13 (1–2): 11–49. doi:10.1023/A:1010000313106. S2CID 14124601.

== See also ==
- CPL (programming language)
