= Stutter bisimulation =

Relationship between transition systems

In theoretical computer science, a stutter bisimulation is a relationship between two transition systems, abstract machines that model computation. It is defined coinductively and generalizes the idea of bisimulations. A bisimulation matches up the states of a machine such that transitions correspond; a stutter bisimulation allows transitions to be matched to finite path fragments.

== Definition ==
In Principles of Model Checking, Baier and Katoen define a stutter bisimulation for a single transition system and later adapt it to a relation on two transition systems. A stutter bisimulation for $\text{TS}=(S, \text{Act}, \to, I, \text{AP}, L)$ is a binary relation R on S such that for all (s_{1},s_{2}) in R:

1. $s_1, s_2$ have the same labels
2. If $s_1\to s_1'$ is a valid transition and $(s_1',s_2)\not\in R$ then there exists a finite path fragment $s_2u_1\cdots u_n s_2'$ ($n\ge 0$) such that each pair $(s_1, u_i)$ is in R and $(s_1',s_2')$ is in R
3. If $s_2\to s_2'$ is a valid transition and $(s_1,s_2')\not\in R$ is not then there exists a finite path fragment $s_1v_1\cdots v_n s_1'$ ($n\ge 0$) such that each pair $(v_i, s_2)$ is in R and $(s_1',s_2')$ is in R

== Generalizations ==
A generalization, the divergent stutter bisimulation, can be used to simplify the state space of a system with the tradeoff that statements using the linear temporal logic operator "next" may change truth value. A robust stutter bisimulation allows uncertainty over transitions in the system.
