= Figment: The Imagination Processor =

Figment: The Imagination Processor is a software published by Patch Panel Software.

== Description ==
Figment: The Imagination Processor is a software package which includes templates that can be used for creating adventures.

== Reception ==
Scorpia reviewed the software for Computer Gaming World, and stated that it has "the means to jump between the game and the editor to make changes "on the fly". This is a handy feature, as you don't have to stop the game to fix problems and then recompile and re-run the program."

== Reviews ==
- The Computer Journal
- https://www.newspapers.com/article/chicago-tribune/173484693/
