= Algebraic semantics =

Algebraic semantics may refer to:

- Algebraic semantics (computer science)
- Algebraic semantics (mathematical logic)
