= Probabilistic bisimulation =

In theoretical computer science, probabilistic bisimulation is an extension of the concept of bisimulation for fully probabilistic transition systems first described by K.G. Larsen and A. Skou.

A discrete probabilistic transition system is a triple

$$S = (\operatorname{St}, \operatorname{Act}, \tau:\operatorname{St} \times \operatorname{Act}\times \operatorname{St}\rightarrow [0,1])$$

where $\tau(s,a,t)$ gives the probability of starting in the state s, performing the action a and ending up in the state t. The set of states is assumed to be countable. There is no attempt to assign probabilities to actions. It is assumed that the actions are chosen nondeterministically by an adversary or by the environment. This type of system is fully probabilistic, there is no other indeterminacy.

The definition of a probabilistic bisimulation on a system S is an equivalence relation R on the state space St, such that for every pair s,t in St with sRt and for every action a in Act and for every equivalence class C of R $\tau(s,a,C) = \tau(t,a,C).$ Two states are said to be probabilistically bisimilar if there is some such R relating them.

When applied to Markov chains, probabilistic bisimulation is the same concept as lumpability. Probabilistic bisimulation extends naturally to weighted bisimulation.
