= Database state =

Database state may refer to:

- Database state, in database technology the set of stored data. Entering, modifying, or deleting information changes the database state. *Actual data stored in a particular moment in time.
  - See also State transition system and Finite-state machine models.
- A state that practices Mass surveillance.
