= Li Wei (computer scientist) =

Chinese computer scientist (1943–2026)

Li Wei 李未
- Born: June 8, 1943; Peking, China
- Died: January 25, 2026 (aged 82); Beijing, China
- Education: Beijing University; University of Edinburgh (PhD)
- Scientific career
- Fields: Computer science
- Workplaces: Newcastle University; University of Edinburgh; Saarland University; Beihang University
- Thesis: An operational approach to semantics and translation for programming languages (1983)
- Doctoral advisor: Gordon Plotkin

Li Wei (Chinese: 李未; pinyin: Lǐ Wèi; June 8, 1943 – January 25, 2026) was a Chinese computer scientist who was a member of the Chinese Academy of Sciences. In 2002, he became President of Beihang University.

== Early life and education ==
Li was born in Peking on June 8, 1943. He graduated from the Department of Mathematics and Mechanics, Peking University in 1966. Li then studied at the University of Edinburgh obtaining a PhD in computer science in 1983 supervised by Gordon Plotkin.

== Career ==
After graduation, he was funded by the EPSRC at Newcastle University and the University of Edinburgh as Senior Programmer. He was also a visiting professor at the Saarland University. Li was elected to the Chinese Academy of Sciences in 1997.

== Death ==
Li died on January 25, 2026, at the age of 82.

== Research interests ==
Li was mostly engaged in the applied research of Computer Software and Theory and Internet, including programming language, software development, artificial intelligence, and integrated circuit design.

== Achievements ==
Li did some of the first work on structural operational semantics of concurrent programming languages such as Ada and Edison, including a theory of translation between such languages with methods for proving the correctness of translations.

1992, building release logic theory solved the incompleteness of information and fallibility of knowledge and nonmonotonicity of inference.

1998, first advocated research on Data Mining Technology。
