= Joost-Pieter Katoen =

Dutch theoretical computer scientist

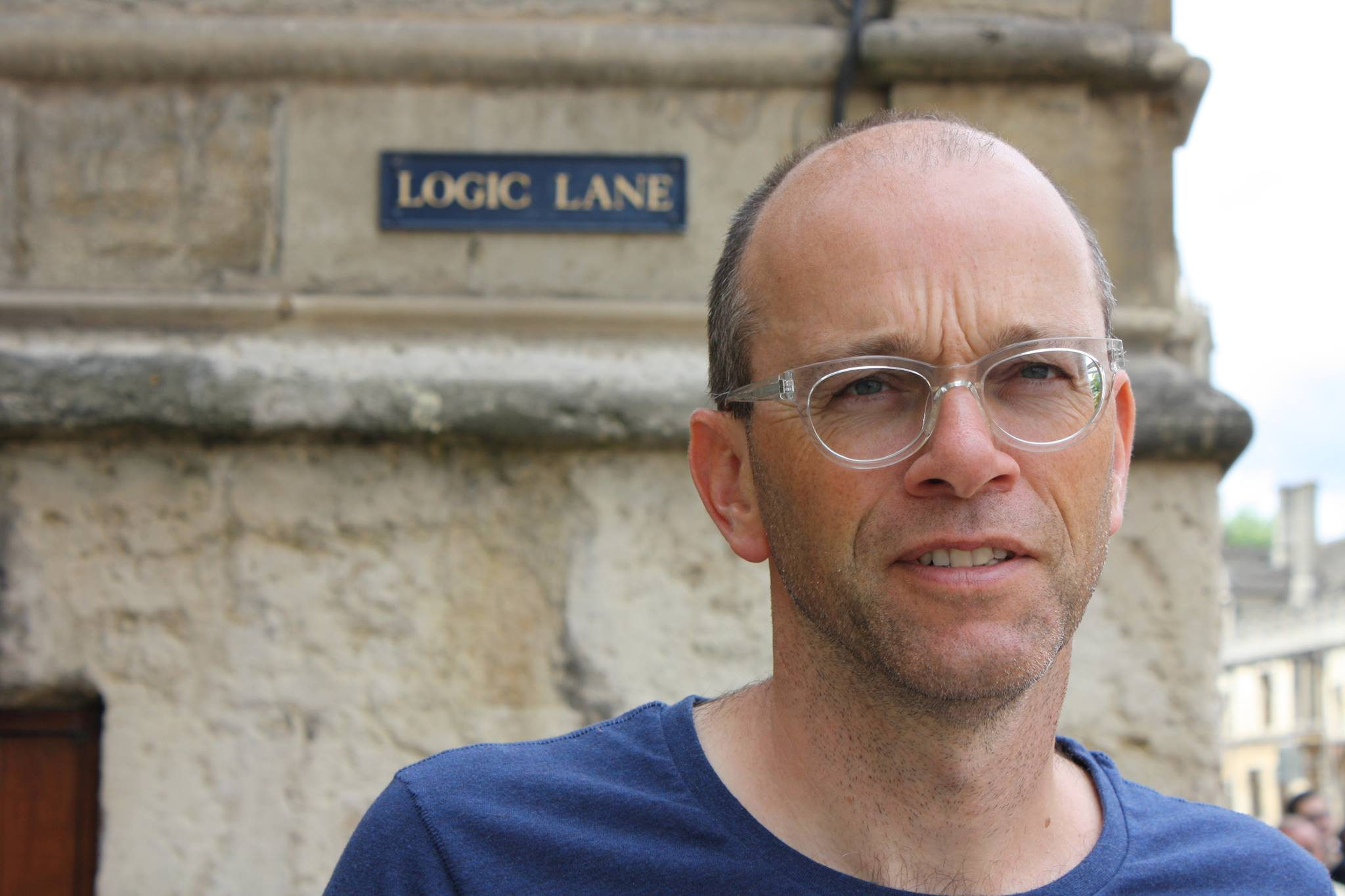
- Joost-Pieter Katoen in Logic Lane, Oxford
- Citizenship: Dutch
- Education: University of Twente (Ph.D.); Eindhoven University of Technology (PDEng); University of Twente (M.Sc.)
- Awards: ERC Advanced Grant, awarded 2018; Honorary Doctorate, Aalborg University, awarded 2017; Member of Academia Europaea, elected 2013; Distinguished Professor, RWTH Aachen University, awarded 2013
- Scientific career
- Fields: Computer Science; Concurrency Theory; Probabilistic Model Checking; Probabilistic Programming
- Workplaces: RWTH Aachen University; University of Twente; University of Erlangen-Nuremberg; Philips Research Labs; Eindhoven University of Technology
- Website: www-i2.informatik.rwth-aachen.de/~katoen/

Joost-Pieter Katoen (born October 6, 1964) is a Dutch theoretical computer scientist based in Germany. He is distinguished professor in Computer Science and head of the Software Modeling and Verification Group at RWTH Aachen University. Furthermore, he is part-time associated to the Formal Methods & Tools group at the University of Twente.

== Education ==
Katoen received his master's degree with distinction in Computer Science from the University of Twente in 1987. In 1990, he was awarded a Professional Doctorate in Engineering from the Eindhoven University of Technology, and in 1996, he received his Ph.D. in computer science from the University of Twente.

== Research ==
Katoen's research focuses on developing mathematical verification methods for assessing the accuracy of programs and computer systems. Katoen's main research interests are formal methods, computer aided verification, in particular model checking and deductive program verification, concurrency theory, and semantics. His developed techniques and software tools are applied in areas such as safety analysis, AI planning, control theory, system biology, and in model‐based performance assessment and reliability analyses.

Together with Christel Baier he wrote and published the book Principles of Model Checking.

== Career ==
From 1997 to 1999, Katoen was a postdoctoral researcher at the University of Erlangen-Nuremberg. In 1999, he became an associate professor at the University of Twente, where he still holds a part-time position. In 2004, he was appointed a full professor at RWTH Aachen University.

Katoen received several honors and awards. In 2013, he became Distinguished Professor at RWTH Aachen University and was elected as member of the Academia Europaea. In 2017, he received an honorary doctorate from Aalborg University. In 2018, Katoen was awarded the highly remunerated ERC Advanced Grant. In 2020, Katoen became an ACM Fellow and in 2021, he was elected as member of the Royal Holland Society of Science and Humanities (KHMW). In 2022, he was elected as member of the North Rhine-Westphalian Academy of Science, Humanities and the Arts. while in 2024 he was elected as member of Leopoldina, the German Academy of Sciences.

Katoen is a founding member of the IFIP Working Group (WG) 1.8 on Concurrency Theory and a member of the WG 2.2 Formal Description of Programming Concepts. From 2006 to 2010, he was engaged in the Review College of the British Engineering and Physical Sciences Research Council (EPSRC). During 2015-2019 he chaired the Steering Committee of the European Joint Conferences on Theory and Practice of Software (ETAPS). Since 2020, he chairs the Steering Committee of the TACAS (Tools and Algorithms for the Construction and Analysis of Systems) conference.

For his commitment to work-life balance, especially for young Ph.D. students with children, he was awarded the FAMOS Prize by RWTH Aachen University in 2017.

Katoen's work has received various recognitions among which best / distinguished paper awards (e.g. as ETAPS 2016, IEEE SRDS 2017, LOPSTR 2020, POPL 2021, OOPSLA 2023 and ETAPS 2024). In 2022, he received the CONCUR test-of-time award for his CONCUR 1999 paper and in 2023 the Jean-Claude Laprie Award on Dependable Computing for his 2003 paper with Baier, Haverkort and Hermanns on Model-Checking of Continuous-Time Markov chains.

== Personal life ==
Joost-Pieter Katoen was born in Krimpen aan den IJssel in 1964. Katoen is married and has three sons. He lives in Maastricht. In his private time, he enjoys cycling and listening to music.

== See also ==
- Joost-Pieter Katoen's homepage.
- Software Modeling and Verification Group.
- List of publications on computer science bibliography site DBLP.
