= Philippa Gardner =

British computer scientist

Philippa Anne Gardner FREng FBCS
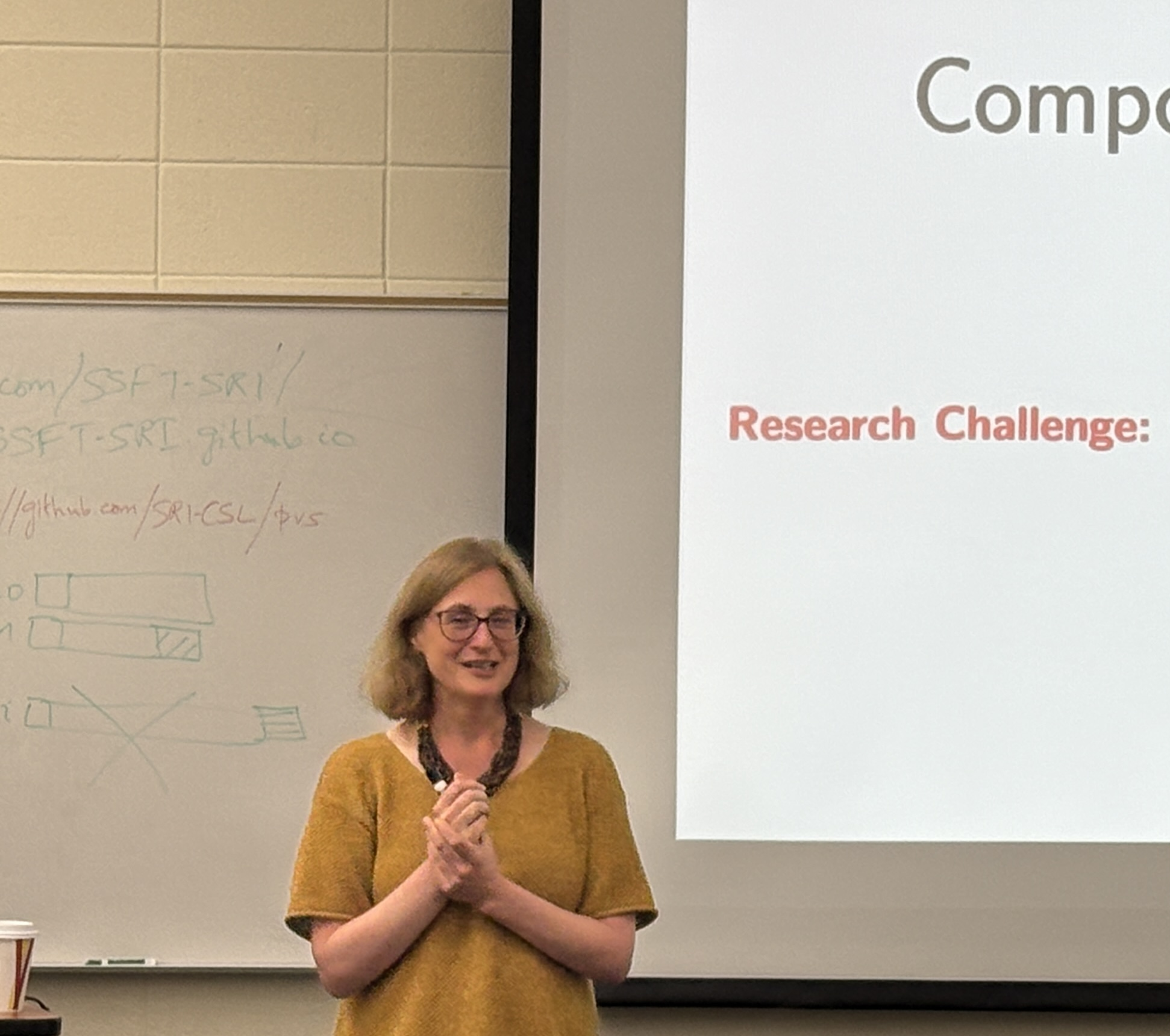
- Born: 29 June 1965 (age 61)
- Education: Bristol University (MSc); Edinburgh (PhD); University of Cambridge (Fellowship)
- Awards: BCS Lovelace Medal (2024)
- Scientific career
- Fields: Formal verification; Programming Languages; Functional Programming
- Workplaces: Imperial College
- Thesis: Representing Logics in Type Theory (1992)
- Doctoral advisor: Gordon Plotkin
- Website: https://www.doc.ic.ac.uk/~pg/

Philippa Anne Gardner FREng (born 29 June 1965) is a British computer scientist and academic. She has been Professor of Theoretical Computer Science at the Department of Computing, Imperial College London since 2009. She was director of the Research Institute in Automated Program Analysis and Verification between 2013 and 2016. In 2020 Gardner was elected a Fellow of the Royal Academy of Engineering.

== Early life and education ==
Gardner was born on 29 June 1965 in Exeter, Devon, England. In 1988 she completed an MSc in logic and computation from Bristol University, supervised by John Shepherdson. Her doctoral studies were supervised by Gordon Plotkin at the University of Edinburgh; she was awarded her PhD in 1992. Her doctoral thesis was titled "Representing Logics in Type Theory".

== Career ==
Before being awarded an EPSRC Advanced Fellowship at Cambridge University with Robin Milner (which ran from 1998 to 2001), Gardner held a BP Research Fellowship with The Royal Society of Edinburgh between 1994 and 1996. She took a lectureship with Imperial College London in 2001. She was appointed Professor of Theoretical Computer Science in 2009. From 2018 to 2023 she was awarded a UKRI Established Fellowship.

Gardner was on the Newton International Fellowships Committee: Physical Sciences, for The Royal Society, from 2010 to 2012.

Gardner's role with the Research Institute in Automated Program Analysis and Verification was funded by GCHQ and the Engineering and Physical Sciences Research Council (EPSRC).

Gardner was awarded the President & Rector's Award for Excellence in Teaching at Imperial College London in 2013 and for Excellence in Research Supervision in 2019.

Her current research looks at program verification. A major project she pursues is building Gillian, a platform for developing symbolic analysis tools.
