= Carolyn Talcott =

American computer scientist (born 1941)

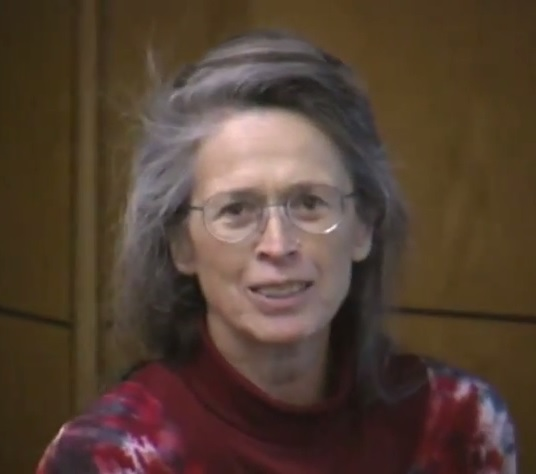
- Carolyn Talcott in 2004
- Born: June 14, 1941 (age 85); Caldwell, Idaho
- Education: University of Denver; UC Berkeley; Stanford University
- Scientific career
- Fields: Computer science; Systems biology
- Workplaces: Stanford University; SRI International
- Thesis: The Essence of RUM: A Theory of the Intensional and Extensional Aspects of LISP-Type Computation (1985)
- Doctoral advisor: Solomon Feferman
- Notable students: Nalini Venkatasubramanian
- Website: www.jlambda.com/clt/

Carolyn Talcott (born June 14, 1941) is an American computer scientist known for work in formal reasoning, especially as it relates to computers, cryptanalysis and systems biology. She is currently the program director of the Symbolic Systems Biology group at SRI International.

She is currently the co-editor-in-chief of Higher-Order and Symbolic Computation. Talcott married John McCarthy (computer scientist) and had a son.

== Early life and education ==
Carolyn was born to Howard Talcott and Harriet Louise Mitchell who were Presbyterians from Idaho. Talcott earned a Ph.D. from Stanford University in 1985. Her dissertation, The Essence of RUM: A Theory of the Intensional and Extensional Aspects of LISP-Type Computation, was supervised by Solomon Feferman.

== Awards and memberships ==
Talcott was named an SRI Fellow in 2011. She is a member of the Association for Computing Machinery and the Association for Symbolic Logic.
