= Christopher Strachey =

English computer scientist and mathematician (1916–1975)

- Undated portrait of Strachey
- Born: 16 November 1916; Hampstead, England
- Died: 18 May 1975 (aged 58); Oxford, England
- Education: University of Cambridge (B.A.)
- Known for: Denotational semantics; Time-sharing; CPL; Strachey love letter algorithm; Checkers (1952); Fundamental Concepts in Programming Languages (1967)
- Parents: Oliver Strachey (father); Ray Costelloe (mother)
- Family: Strachey family
- Scientific career
- Fields: Computer science
- Workplaces: University of Cambridge; University of Oxford; St Edmund's School, Canterbury; Harrow School
- Doctoral students: Peter Mosses; David Turner

Christopher S. Strachey (/ˈstreɪtʃi/ STRAY-chee; 16 November 1916 – 18 May 1975) was an English computer scientist and mathematician. A pioneer of programming language design and the mathematical foundations of computing, he was one of the founders of denotational semantics, developed in collaboration with Dana Scott, and an early advocate of computer time-sharing. He was the main architect of the Combined Programming Language (CPL) and wrote the influential lecture notes Fundamental Concepts in Programming Languages (1967), which formalised concepts including the distinction between L-values and R-values.

Born in Hampstead into the prominent Strachey family, he was educated at Gresham's School and King's College, Cambridge, where he studied mathematics and physics. After wartime work as a research physicist on radar at Standard Telephones and Cables, he taught at St Edmund's School, Canterbury, and Harrow School before entering computing in 1951. His early programs included Checkers (1952), a draughts-playing program for the Pilot ACE and Ferranti Mark I often cited among the earliest video games, and a love-letter-generating program for the Manchester Mark 1 developed that same year. He later worked at the National Research Development Corporation and as an independent consultant before joining the University of Cambridge and, in 1965, founding the Programming Research Group at the University of Oxford, where he became the university’s first professor of computer science.

Strachey’s collaborations with Scott in the late 1960s and early 1970s produced the foundations of denotational semantics. He was elected a Distinguished Fellow of the British Computer Society in 1971. Strachey died in Oxford on 18 May 1975 of hepatitis, aged 58, while his work on programming language semantics was still developing. He is remembered as one of the formative figures in theoretical computer science, particularly for his contributions to denotational semantics, programming language design and the intellectual foundations of modern computing.

== Early life and education ==
Christopher S. Strachey was born on 16 November 1916 to Oliver and Ray Strachey (née Costelloe) in Hampstead, England. Oliver Strachey was the son of Richard Strachey and the great-grandson of Sir Henry Strachey, 1st Baronet. His elder sister was the writer Barbara Strachey. In 1919 the family moved to 51 Gordon Square. The Stracheys belonged to the Bloomsbury Group, whose members included Virginia Woolf, John Maynard Keynes, and Strachey's uncle Lytton Strachey. At the age of thirteen, Strachey went to Gresham's School, where he showed signs of brilliance but in general performed poorly. He was admitted to King's College, Cambridge, in 1935, where he continued to neglect his studies. Strachey studied mathematics and then transferred to physics. At the end of his third year at Cambridge, Strachey suffered a nervous breakdown, possibly related to coming to terms with his homosexuality. He returned to Cambridge but managed only a "lower second" in the Natural Sciences Tripos.

== Career ==
Unable to continue his education, Strachey joined Standard Telephones and Cables (STC) as a research physicist. His first job was providing mathematical analysis for the design of electron tubes used in radar. The complexity of the calculations required the use of a differential analyser. This initial experience with a computing machine sparked Strachey's interest, and he began to research the topic. An application for a research degree at the University of Cambridge was rejected, and Strachey continued to work at STC throughout the Second World War. After the war, he fulfilled a long-standing ambition by becoming a schoolmaster at St Edmund's School, Canterbury, teaching mathematics and physics. Three years later, he was able to move to the more prestigious Harrow School in 1949, where he stayed for three years.

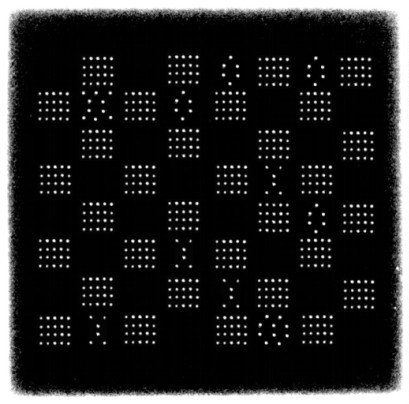
Checkers on a storage CRT, 1952

In January 1951, a friend introduced him to Mike Woodger of the National Physical Laboratory (NPL). The lab had successfully built a reduced version of Alan Turing's Automatic Computing Engine (ACE) the concept of which dated from 1945: the Pilot ACE. In his spare time, Strachey developed a checkers video game in May 1951. This may have been the first video game. The game completely exhausted the Pilot ACE's memory. The draughts program failed due to program errors when it first ran at NPL on 30 July 1951. When Strachey heard about the Manchester Mark 1, which had a much bigger memory, he asked his former fellow-student Alan Turing for the manual and transcribed his program into the operation codes of that machine by around October 1951. By the summer of 1952, the program could "play a complete game of Draughts at a reasonable speed". While he did not give this game a name, Noah Wardrip-Fruin named it "M. U. C. Draughts."

Strachey programmed the first computer music in England – the earliest recording of music played by a computer: a rendition of the British National Anthem "God Save the King" on the University of Manchester's Ferranti Mark 1 computer, in 1951. Later that year, short extracts of three pieces were recorded there by a BBC outside broadcasting unit: "God Save the King", "Baa, Baa, Black Sheep", and "In the Mood". Researchers at the University of Canterbury, Christchurch restored the acetate master disc in 2016 and the results may be heard on SoundCloud.

During the summer of 1952, Strachey programmed a love letter generator for the Ferranti Mark 1 that is known as the first example of computer-generated literature.

In May 1952, Strachey gave a two-part talk on "the study of control in animals and machines" ("cybernetics") for the BBC Home Service's Science Survey programme.

Strachey worked for the National Research Development Corporation (NRDC) from 1952 to 1959. While working on the St. Lawrence Seaway project, he was able to visit several computer centres in the United States and catalogue their instruction sets. Later, he worked on programming both the Elliott 401 computer and the Ferranti Pegasus computer. Together with Donald B. Gillies, he filed three patents in computing design, including the design of base registers for program relocation. He also worked on the analysis of vibration in aircraft, working briefly with Roger Penrose.

In 1959, Strachey left NRDC to become a computer consultant working for NRDC, EMI, Ferranti, and other organisations on several wide-ranging projects. This work included logical design for computers, providing autocode and, later, the design of high-level programming languages. For a contract to produce the autocode for the Ferranti Orion computer, Strachey hired Peter Landin, who became his one assistant for the duration of Strachey's consulting period.

Strachey developed the concept of time-sharing in 1959. He filed a patent application in February that year and gave a paper entitled "Time Sharing in Large Fast Computers" at the inaugural UNESCO Information Processing Conference in Paris, where he passed the concept on to J. C. R. Licklider. This paper is credited by the MIT Computation Center in 1963 as "the first paper on time-shared computers".

In 1962, while remaining a consultant, he accepted a position at the University of Cambridge.

In 1965, Strachey accepted a position at the University of Oxford as the first director of the Programming Research Group and later the university's first professor of computer science and fellow of Wolfson College, Oxford. He collaborated with Dana Scott.

Strachey was elected as a Distinguished Fellow of the British Computer Society in 1971 for his pioneering work in computer science.

In 1973, Strachey (along with Robert Milne) began to write an essay submitted to the Adams Prize competition, after which they continued work to revise it into book form. Strachey participated in the 1973 Lighthill debate on Artificial Intelligence with John McCarthy and others (see Lighthill report).

He developed the Combined Programming Language (CPL). His influential set of lecture notes Fundamental Concepts in Programming Languages formalised the distinction between L- and R- values (as seen in the C programming language). Strachey also coined the term currying, although he did not invent the underlying concept.

He was instrumental in the design of the Ferranti Pegasus computer.

The macro language m4 derives much from Strachey's GPM (General Purpose Macrogenerator), one of the earliest macro expansion languages.

Strachey contracted an illness diagnosed as jaundice, which, after a period of seeming recovery, returned, and he died of infectious hepatitis on 18 May 1975. After his death, Strachey was succeeded by Sir Tony Hoare as Head of the Programming Research Group at Oxford, starting in 1977.

== Legacy ==
1960s computer printout of Strachey, held in the Bodleian Library at the University of Oxford

The Department of Computer Science at the University of Oxford has a Christopher Strachey Professorship of Computing, which has been held by the following:

- Sir Tony Hoare FRS (1988–2000)
- Samson Abramsky FRS (2000–2021)
- Nobuko Yoshida (2022 onwards)

In 1995, the Strachey Lectures in Computing Science were established at the University of Oxford in Strachey's memory. In November 2016, a Strachey 100 event was held at Oxford University to celebrate the centenary of Strachey's birth, including a viewing at the Weston Library in Oxford of the Christopher Strachey archive held in the Bodleian Library collection.

== Publications ==
- Strachey, Christopher (1952). "Logical or Non-Mathematical Programmes". Proceedings of the 1952 ACM national meeting. Toronto: ACM. pp. 46–49. doi:10.1145/800259.808992.
- Strachey, Christopher (1954). "The "Thinking" Machine". Encounter. pp. 25–31.
- Strachey, Christopher (1959). "Programme-Controlled Time Sharing". Proceedings of the IEE - Part B: Electronic and Communication Engineering. 106 (29): 462. doi:10.1049/pi-b-2.1959.0311.
- Strachey, Christopher (1959). "On Taking the Square Root of a Complex Number". The Computer Journal. 2 (2): 89. doi:10.1093/comjnl/2.2.89.
- Strachey, Christopher (1959). "Time Sharing in Large, Fast Computers". Proceedings of the 1st International Conference on Information Processing. Paris: UNESCO. pp. 336–341.
- Strachey, Christopher (1960). "Two Contributions to the Techniques of Queuing Problems". The Computer Journal. 3 (2): 114–116. doi:10.1093/comjnl/3.2.114.
- Strachey, Christopher (1961). "Bitwise Operations". Communications of the ACM. 4 (3): 146. doi:10.1145/366199.366254. S2CID 7359297.
- Strachey, Christopher; Wilkes, Maurice (1961). "Some Proposals for Improving the Efficiency of ALGOL 60". Communications of the ACM. 4 (11): 488–491. doi:10.1145/366813.366816. S2CID 8757176.
- Strachey, Christopher; Francis, John (1961). "The Reduction of a Matrix to Codiagonal Form by Eliminations". The Computer Journal. 4 (2): 168–176. doi:10.1093/comjnl/4.2.168.
- Strachey, Christopher (1962). "Book Reviews". The Computer Journal. 5 (2): 152–153. doi:10.1093/comjnl/5.2.152.
- Barron, David; Buxton, John; Hartley, David; Nixon, Eric; Strachey, Christopher (1963). "The Main Features of CPL". The Computer Journal. 6 (2): 134–143. doi:10.1093/comjnl/6.2.134.
- Strachey, Christopher (1965). "An Impossible Program". The Computer Journal. 7 (4): 313. doi:10.1093/comjnl/7.4.313.
- Strachey, Christopher (1965). "A General Purpose Macrogenerator". The Computer Journal. 8 (3): 225–241. doi:10.1093/comjnl/8.3.225.
- Strachey, Christopher (1966). "System Analysis and Programming". Scientific American. Vol. 215, no. 3. pp. 112–127.
- Strachey, Christopher (1966). "Towards a Formal Semantics". Proceedings of the IFIP Working Conference on Formal Language Description Languages. Amsterdam: North Holland. pp. 198–220.
- Strachey, Christopher (1967). Fundamental Concepts in Programming Languages (Technical report). Lecture notes for the International Summer School in Computer Programming at Copenhagen. Also: Strachey, Christopher (2000). "Fundamental Concepts in Programming Languages". Higher-Order and Symbolic Computation. 13 (1–2): 11–49. doi:10.1023/A:1010000313106. S2CID 14124601.
- Scott, Dana; Strachey, Christopher (1971). Toward a Mathematical Semantics for Computer Languages (Technical report). Oxford University Computing Laboratory, Programming Research Group. PRG06. Also: Scott, Dana; Strachey, Christopher (1971). "Toward a Mathematical Semantics for Computer Languages". Proceedings of the Symposium on Computers and Automata. New York: Polytechnic Institute of Brooklyn. pp. 19–46.
- Strachey, Christopher (1972). "Varieties of Programming Language". Proceedings of the International Computing Symposium. Venice: Cini Foundation. pp. 222–233. Also: Strachey, Christopher (1973). The Varieties of Programming Language (Technical report). Oxford University Computing Laboratory, Programming Research Group. PRG10.
- Stoy, Joseph; Strachey, Christopher (1972). "OS6—An Experimental Operating System for a Small Computer. Part 1: General Principles and Structure". The Computer Journal. 15 (2): 117–124. doi:10.1093/comjnl/15.2.117.
- Stoy, Joseph; Strachey, Christopher (1972). "OS6—An Experimental Operating System for a Small Computer. Part 2: Input/Output and Filing System". The Computer Journal. 15 (3): 195–203. doi:10.1093/comjnl/15.3.195.
- Strachey, Christopher; Stoy, Joseph (1972). The Text of OSPub (Technical report). Oxford University Computing Laboratory, Programming Research Group. PRG09.
- Strachey, Christopher; Wadsworth, Christopher (1974). Continuations: A Mathematical Semantics for Handling Full Jumps (Technical report). Oxford University Computing Laboratory, Programming Research Group. PRG11. Also: Strachey, Christopher; Wadsworth, Christopher (2000). "Continuations: A Mathematical Semantics for Handling Full Jumps". Higher-Order and Symbolic Computation. 13 (1–2): 135–152. doi:10.1023/A:1010026413531. S2CID 10673265.
- Milne, Robert; Strachey, Christopher (1976). A Theory of Programming Language Semantics. New York: Springer. ISBN 978-1-5041-2833-9.
