= Tom Crick =

British computer scientist, engineer and senior civil servant (born 1981)

Tom Crick MBE CEng FBCS FIET FLSW FAcSS
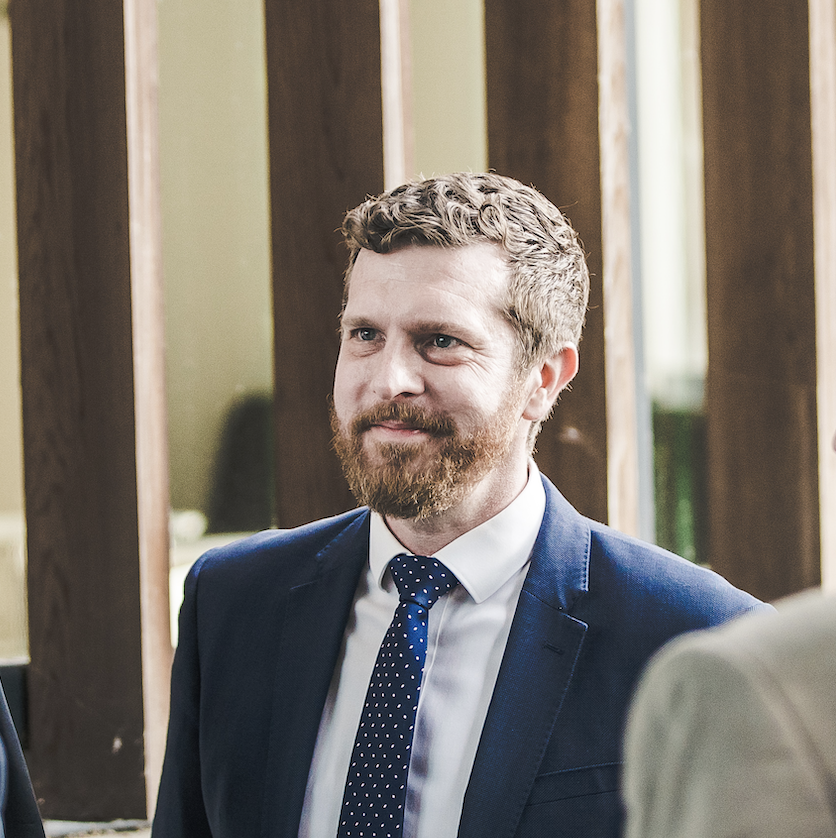
- Crick in May 2023
- Born: January 1981 (age 45); Oxford, UK
- Education: University of Bath (BSc, PhD)
- Known for: Computing education, artificial intelligence, technology policy, systems engineering
- Scientific career
- Workplaces: University of Bath; Cardiff Metropolitan University; Swansea University; Department for Digital, Culture, Media and Sport; University of Bristol
- Thesis: Superoptimisation: Provably Optimal Code Generation using Answer Set Programming (2009)
- Website: research-information.bris.ac.uk/en/persons/tom-crick/

Tom Crick (born January 1981) is a British computer scientist and engineer, a science and technology policymaker, and a senior civil servant. He is Chief Scientific Adviser to the UK Government's Department for Digital, Culture, Media and Sport, and Professor of Digital Society and Policy at the University of Bristol. His work spans national computing education reform, digital and data policy, and the engineering and governance of large-scale AI-enabled systems in public services and government.

== Early life and education ==
Crick was raised and educated in Wheatley, Oxfordshire, attending Wheatley Park School. He completed his undergraduate and postgraduate studies in computer science at the University of Bath, having been sponsored through his undergraduate degree by ARM. His doctoral research, funded by the EPSRC, considered superoptimisation by developing practical strategies for generating provably optimal code for program optimisation using answer set programming.

== Career ==
After a period as a postdoctoral researcher on ALIVE, a European Commission FP7-funded project at the University of Bath, Crick was appointed lecturer in computer science at Cardiff Metropolitan University in 2009, before being promoted to full professor in 2016. He was recognised as a UK National Teaching Fellow in 2014. He moved to a research chair at Swansea University in 2018, becoming Deputy Pro-Vice-Chancellor for Civic Mission from 2021-2023. He was appointed Professor of Digital Society and Policy at the University of Bristol in January 2026.

=== Government service ===
In November 2023, Crick joined the UK Government's Department for Digital, Culture, Media and Sport (DCMS) as Chief Scientific Adviser. In this role, he provides scientific and technical leadership across the department's policy areas, advising ministers and senior officials on science, technology and artificial intelligence. His responsibilities include supporting the design, governance, assurance and deployment of complex socio-technical AI-enabled systems across areas such as media, culture, the creative industries, sport and civil society, and contributing to cross-government scientific advisory structures that promote high-quality, evidence-based policymaking. Crick was appointed to the Council of the Arts and Humanities Research Council in 2025. He is currently chair of the Social and Behavioural Science for Emergencies (SBSE) Steering Group.

=== Professional service ===
In 2017, Crick was elected Vice-President of BCS, The Chartered Institute for IT for a three-year term. He has also served in a number of senior elected positions in the Association for Computing Machinery, including Vice-Chair of ACM Europe Council and a Member-at-Large of ACM Council. Crick was elected Secretary/Treasurer of the ACM for a two-year term from July 2026.

Crick is editor-in-chief (2021–present) of The Computer Journal, published by Oxford University Press, and an editor (2020–present) of the Wales Journal of Education, published by University of Wales Press.

== Computing education and digital skills ==
Crick has been involved with the reform of the school-level science and technology curriculum in Wales since 2010. In 2013, he was appointed by the Welsh Government to chair an independent review of the ICT curriculum in Wales. Crick concluded that the existing curriculum did not adequately equip learners with the digital skills required for contemporary education and employment. This work treated digital education and skills provision as a large-scale socio-technical system, integrating curriculum design, assessment, teacher capability and supporting digital infrastructure.

From 2015–2016, Crick chaired the development of the bilingual Digital Competence Framework in Wales, which elevated digital competence (the skills, knowledge and attitudes required to be confident in the use of technologies) to the same statutory position as literacy and numeracy in the new Curriculum for Wales. It outlined how schools could incorporate student-centred digital competency into their local curriculum.

He then led the development of the Science & Technology strand of the new Curriculum for Wales in 2017. His efforts united the traditional sciences (physics, chemistry and biology) with computer science and design & technology. The new curriculum was published in January 2020 and started phasing in for all schools in Wales from September 2022 onwards. Crick was also appointed Chair of the National Network of Excellence in Science & Technology, a £4m Welsh Government strategic investment which focused on supporting STEM teachers in partnership with higher education institutions.

Crick also chaired Qualification Wales’ 2018 review of ICT sector qualifications, which reported that they were outdated and needed considerable reform, resulting in new GCSE and A-Level qualifications in Digital Technology from 2021 onwards.

== Non-executive and board-level roles ==
Crick was a non-executive director of Dŵr Cymru Welsh Water from 2017–2026; a non-executive director of Swansea Bay University Health Board from 2017–2024; an inaugural Commissioner of the National Infrastructure Commission for Wales from 2018–2022; a non-executive director of the Ofcom Advisory Committee for Wales from 2021–2023; and a non-executive director of Industry Wales from 2021–2024. Alongside being a Vice-President of BCS, The Chartered Institute for IT, he was a trustee from 2013–2020. He has previously been a trustee of the British Science Association and the Campaign for Science and Engineering (both 2011–2017).

== Awards and honours ==
- 2011: British Science Association Media Fellow with BBC Wales
- 2013: Worshipful Livery Company of Wales Gold Award
- 2014: HEA National Teaching Fellow
- 2017: Member of the Most Excellent Order of the British Empire (MBE)
- 2020: British Educational Research Association Public Engagement and Impact Award
- 2020: Fellow of the Learned Society of Wales
- 2022: IET Achievement Medal
- 2022: Fellow of the Academy of Social Sciences
- 2023: BCS Lovelace Medal
- 2023: Learned Society of Wales Hugh Owen Medal
- 2024: British Science Association Honorary Fellow
- 2026: Royal Statistical Society William Guy Lecturer
