= ACM Transactions on Programming Languages and Systems =

- Discipline: Programming language
- Language: English
- Edited by: Alastair F. Donaldson

Publication details
- History: 1979–present
- Publisher: ACM (United States)
- Frequency: Quarterly
- Impact factor: 0.410 (2020)

Standard abbreviations
- ISO 4: ACM Trans. Program. Lang. Syst.

Indexing
- ISSN: 0164-0925 (print); 1558-4593 (web)

Links
- Journal homepage; Online access; Online archive

The ACM Transactions on Programming Languages and Systems (TOPLAS) is a quarterly, open access, peer-reviewed scientific journal on the topic of programming languages published by the Association for Computing Machinery.

It has been used as a model for teaching the peer review process to graduate students because of its "reputation as a top journal within the computer science community".

== Background ==
Published since 1979, the journal's scope includes programming language design, implementation, and semantics of programming languages, compilers and interpreters, run-time systems, storage allocation and garbage collection, and formal specification, testing, and verification of software. It is indexed in Scopus and SCImago.

The editor-in-chief is Alastair F. Donaldson (Imperial College London). After being ranked as a top-quartile journal in software by SCImago from 1999 to 2016, it has been ranked as second-quartile from 2021 through 2024, with an impact factor of 0.564.
