= Axiomatic semantics =

Logic for proving computer program correctness

Axiomatic semantics is an approach based on mathematical logic for proving the correctness of computer programs. It is closely related to Hoare logic.

Axiomatic semantics define the meaning of a command in a program by describing its effect on assertions about the program state. The assertions are logical statements—predicates with variables, where the variables define the state of the program.

== See also ==
- Algebraic semantics (computer science) — in terms of algebras
- Denotational semantics — by translation of the program into another language
- Operational semantics — in terms of the state of the computation
- Formal semantics of programming languages — overview
- Predicate transformer semantics — describes the meaning of a program fragment as the function transforming a postcondition to the precondition needed to establish it.
- Assertion (computing)
