= Gilles Kahn =

French computer scientist (1946–2006)

- Born: April 17, 1946; Paris, France
- Died: February 9, 2006 (aged 59); Garches, Paris, France
- Known for: Kahn process network
- Scientific career
- Fields: Computer science

Gilles Kahn (17 April 1946 – 9 February 2006) was a French computer scientist. He notably introduced Kahn process networks as a model for parallel processing and natural semantics for describing the operational semantics of programming languages.

Gilles Kahn was born in Paris. He studied at the École polytechnique (X1964) and at Stanford. He became a member of the French Academy of Sciences in 1997. He was president and director-general of INRIA from 2004 to 2006. He died in Garches.
