= Christel Baier =

German theoretical computer scientist

Christel Baier (born September 26, 1965) is a German theoretical computer scientist known for her work in model checking, temporal logic, and automata theory. She is a professor at TU Dresden, where she holds the chair for Algebraic and Logic Foundations of Computer Science at the Faculty of Computer Science. Since the beginning of 2025, she is dean of the Faculty of Computer Science at TU Dresden. From 2015 to 2022, Baier was editor-in-chief of Acta Informatica.

== Education and career ==
Baier earned a diploma in mathematics at the University of Mannheim in 1990, and stayed at the same university for her graduate studies in computer science, completing her Ph.D. there in 1994. Her dissertation "Transitionssystem- und Baum-Semantiken für CCS" was supervised by Mila Majster-Cederbaum. She earned a habilitation at Mannheim in 1999.

She became an associate professor for computer science at the University of Bonn in 1999, and moved to TU Dresden as a professor in 2006.

== Book ==
With Joost-Pieter Katoen, Baier is coauthor of the book Principles of Model Checking (MIT Press, 2008).

== Recognition ==
Baier was elected to the Academia Europaea in 2011. In 2025, she became member of the Saxon Academy of Sciences and Humanitites, and in 2026, she was elected into the German National Academy of Sciences Leopoldina.
