= Gordon Plotkin =

Computer Scientist

Gordon Plotkin FRS FRSE MAE
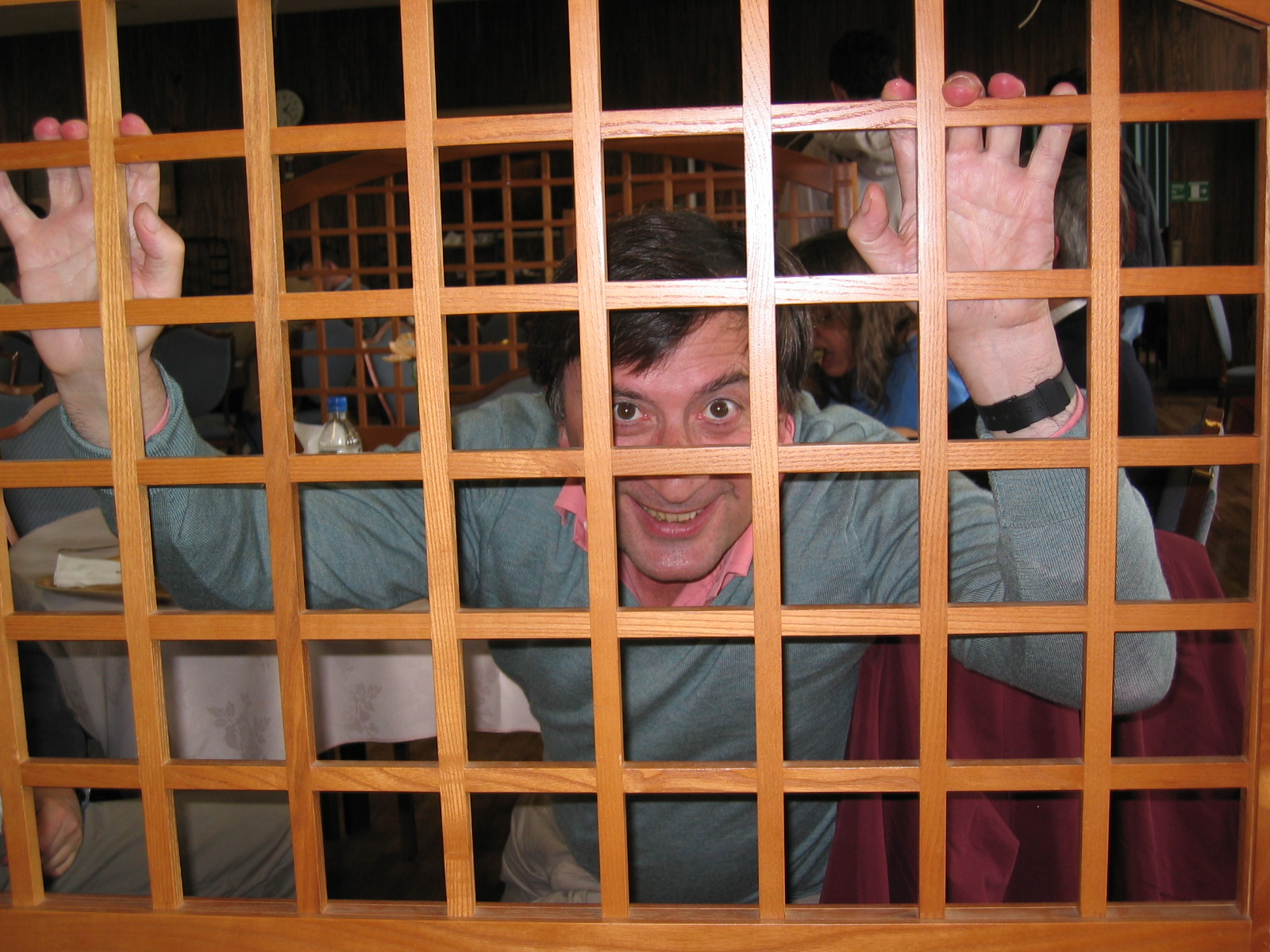
- Plotkin in 2005
- Born: Gordon David Plotkin; 9 September 1946 (age 79); Glasgow, Scotland
- Education: University of Glasgow (BSc); University of Edinburgh (PhD)
- Known for: Programming Computable Functions; Unbounded nondeterminism Operational semantics Domain theory
- Awards: Milner Award (2012); Royal Society Wolfson Research Merit Award; EATCS Award
- Scientific career
- Fields: Logic; Mathematics; Computer science
- Workplaces: University of Edinburgh; Laboratory for Foundations of Computer Science; School of Informatics; University of Glasgow
- Thesis: Automatic methods of inductive inference (1972)
- Doctoral advisor: Rod Burstall; Donald Michie
- Doctoral students: Luca Cardelli; Philippa Gardner; Doug Gurr; Eugenio Moggi; Lǐ Wèi
- Website: homepages.inf.ed.ac.uk/gdp inf.ed.ac.uk/people/staff/Gordon_Plotkin.html

Gordon David Plotkin (born 9 September 1946) is a theoretical computer scientist in the School of Informatics at the University of Edinburgh. Plotkin is probably best known for his introduction of structural operational semantics (SOS) and his work on denotational semantics. In particular, his notes on A Structural Approach to Operational Semantics were very influential. He has contributed to many other areas of computer science.

== Education ==
Plotkin was educated at the University of Glasgow and the University of Edinburgh, gaining his Bachelor of Science degree in 1967 and PhD in 1972 supervised by Rod Burstall.

== Career and research ==
Plotkin has remained at Edinburgh, and was, with Burstall and Robin Milner, a co-founder of the Laboratory for Foundations of Computer Science (LFCS). His former doctoral students include Luca Cardelli, Philippa Gardner, Doug Gurr, Eugenio Moggi, and Lǐ Wèi.

=== Awards and honours ===
Plotkin was elected a Fellow of the Royal Society (FRS) in 1992, and a Fellow of the Royal Society of Edinburgh (FRSE) and is a Member of the Academia Europæa and the American Academy of Arts and Sciences. He is also a winner of the Royal Society Wolfson Research Merit Award. Plotkin received the Milner Award in 2012 for "his fundamental research into programming semantics with lasting impact on both the principles and design of programming languages." His nomination for the Royal Society reads:

Plotkin has contributed to Artificial Intelligence, Logic, Linguistics and especially to Computer Science. In AI he worked on hypothesis-formation and universal unification; in Logic, on frameworks for arbitrary logics; in Linguistics, on formalising situation theory. His main general contribution has been to establish a semantic framework for Computer Science, especially programming languages. Particular significant results are in the lambda-calculus (elementary models, definability, call-by-value), non-determinism (powerdomain theory), semantic formalisms (structured operational semantics, metalanguages), and categories of semantic domains (coherent, pro-finite, concrete). Further contributions concern the semantic paradigm of full abstraction, concurrency theory (event structures), programming logic and type theory.
