= Synchronous Data Flow =

Synchronous Data Flow (SDF) is a restriction on Kahn process networks where the number of tokens read and written by each process is known ahead of time. In some cases, processes can be scheduled such that channels have bounded FIFOs.

== Limitations ==
SDF does not account for asynchronous processes as their token read/write rates will vary. Practically, one can divide the network into synchronous sub-networks connected by asynchronous links. Alternatively a runtime supervisor can enforce fairness and other desired properties.

== Applications ==
SDF is useful for modeling digital signal processing (DSP) routines. Models can be compiled to target parallel hardware like FPGAs, processors with DSP instruction sets like Qualcomm's Hexagon, and other systems.

== See also ==
- Kahn process networks
- Petri net
- Dataflow architecture
- Digital signal processing § Implementation
