= Model of computation =

Mathematical model describing how an output of a function is computed given an input

In computer science, and more specifically in computability theory and computational complexity theory, a model of computation is a model that describes how an output of a mathematical function is computed given an input. A model of computation describes how units of computations, memories, and communications are organized. The computational complexity of an algorithm can be measured given a model of computation. Using a model allows studying the performance of algorithms independently of the variations that are specific to particular implementations and specific technology.

== Categories ==
Models of computation can be classified into three categories: sequential models, functional models, and concurrent models.

=== Sequential models ===
Sequential models include:

- Finite-state machines
- Post machines (Post–Turing machines and tag machines).
- Pushdown automata
- Register machines
  - Random-access machines
- Turing machines
- Decision tree model
- External memory model

=== Functional models ===
Functional models include:

- Abstract rewriting systems
- Combinatory logic
- General recursive functions
- Lambda calculus

=== Concurrent models ===
Concurrent models include:

- Actor model
- Cellular automaton
- Interaction nets
- Kahn process networks
- Logic gates and digital circuits
- Petri nets
- Process calculus
- Synchronous Data Flow

Some of these models have both deterministic and nondeterministic variants. Nondeterministic models are used in the study of computational complexity of algorithms.

Models differ in their expressive power; for example, each function that can be computed by a finite-state machine can also be computed by a Turing machine, but not vice versa.

== Uses ==
In the field of runtime analysis of algorithms, it is common to specify a computational model in terms of primitive operations allowed which have unit cost, or simply unit-cost operations. A commonly used example is the random-access machine, which has unit cost for read and write access to all of its memory cells. In this respect, it differs from the above-mentioned Turing machine model.

== See also ==
- Stack machine (0-operand machine)
- Accumulator machine (1-operand machine)
- Register machine (2,3,... operand machine)
- Random-access machine
- Abstract machine
- Cell-probe model
- Robertson–Webb query model
- Chomsky hierarchy
- Turing completeness
