= Higher-Order and Symbolic Computation =

Computer science journal (1988–2013)

- Discipline: Computer science
- Language: English

Publication details
- Former names: LISP and Symbolic Computation
- Publisher: Springer Science+Business Media

Standard abbreviations
- ISO 4: High.-Order Symb. Comput.

Indexing
- ISSN: 1388-3690

Links
- Journal homepage

Higher-Order and Symbolic Computation (formerly LISP and Symbolic Computation) was a computer science journal published by Springer Science+Business Media. It focuses on programming concepts and abstractions and programming language theory. The final issue appeared in 2013.

== Editors ==
Former editors-in-chief of the journal have been:

- Richard P. Gabriel, Sun Microsystems, Inc., USA (1988 – 1991)
- Guy L. Steele Jr., Sun Microsystems, Inc., USA (1988 – 1991)
- Robert R. Kessler, University of Utah, USA (1991 – 1998)

The last editors-in-chief were Olivier Danvy (Aarhus University) and Carolyn Talcott (SRI International).

== Abstracting and indexing ==
The journal is abstracted and indexed in Academic OneFile, ACM Computing Reviews, ACM Digital Library, Computer Abstracts International Database, Computer Science Index, Current Abstracts, EBSCO, EI-Compendex, INSPEC, io-port.net, PASCAL, Scopus, Summon by Serial Solutions, VINITI Database RAS, and Zentralblatt MATH.

== See also ==
- Journal of Functional Programming
- Journal of Functional and Logic Programming
- Journal of Symbolic Computation
