= Eugenio Moggi =

Professor of computer science at the University of Genoa, Italy

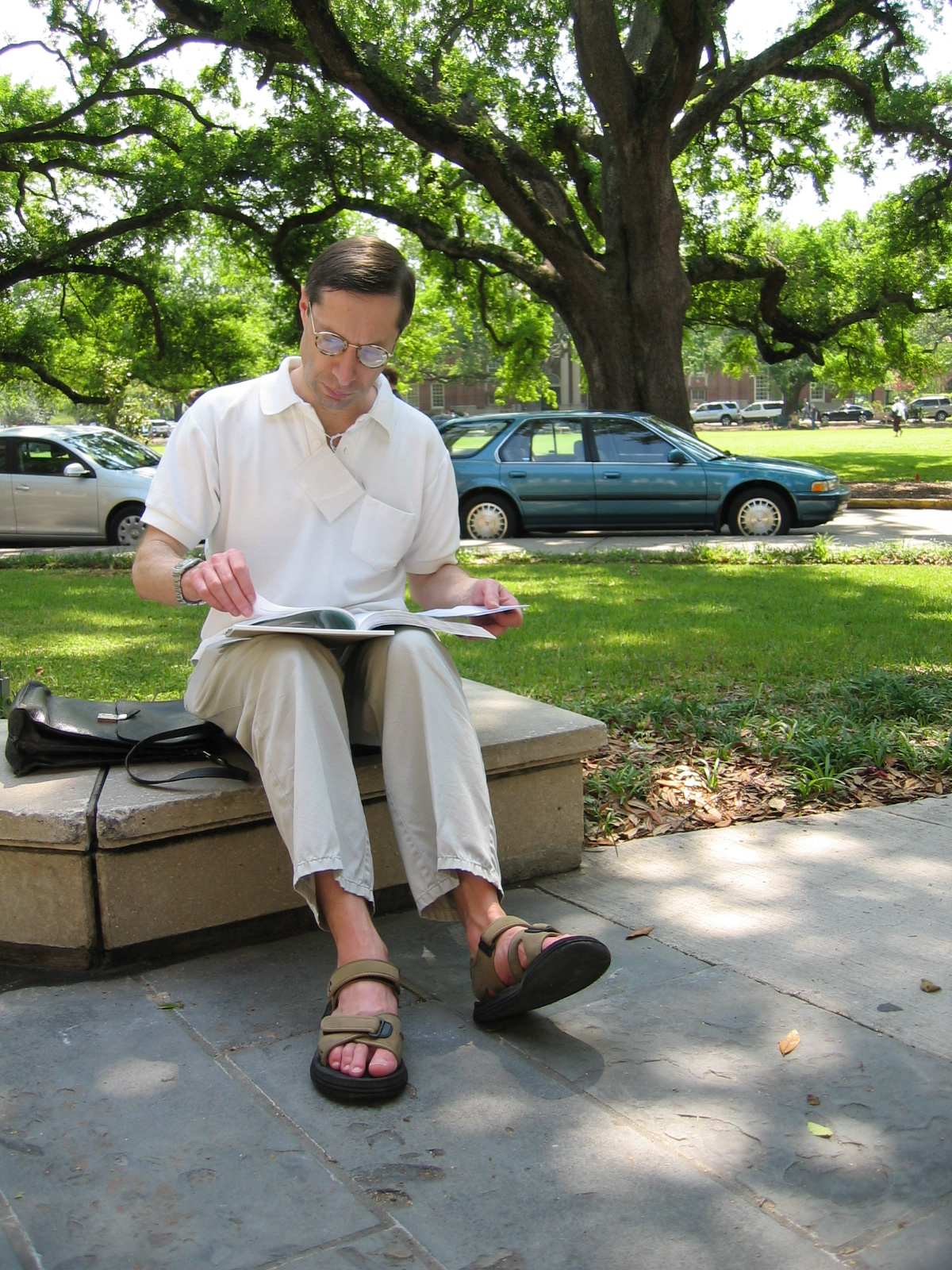
- Born: Florence, Italy
- Education: University of Edinburgh; University of Pisa
- Known for: Monad
- Scientific career
- Workplaces: University of Genoa
- Doctoral advisor: Gordon Plotkin

Eugenio Moggi is a professor of computer science at the University of Genoa, Italy.

He first described the general use of monads to structure programs.

== Biography ==
Academic qualifications:

- PhD in Computer Science, University of Edinburgh 1988
- Laurea in Computer Science, University of Pisa 1983
- Diploma, Scuola Normale Superiore di Pisa 1983
