= Divergence (computer science) =

Computation which does not terminate or terminates in an exceptional state

In computer science, a computation is said to diverge if it does not terminate or terminates in an exceptional state. Otherwise it is said to converge. In domains where computations are expected to be infinite, such as process calculi, a computation is said to diverge if it fails to be productive (i.e. to continue producing an action within a finite amount of time).

== Definitions ==
Various subfields of computer science use varying, but mathematically precise, definitions of what it means for a computation to converge or diverge.

=== Rewriting ===
In abstract rewriting, an abstract rewriting system is called convergent if it is both confluent and terminating.

The notation t ↓ n means that t reduces to normal form n in zero or more reductions, t↓ means t reduces to some normal form in zero or more reductions, and t↑ means t does not reduce to a normal form; the latter is impossible in a terminating rewriting system.

In the lambda calculus an expression is divergent if it has no normal form.

=== Denotational semantics ===
In denotational semantics an object function f : A → B can be modelled as a mathematical function $f : A \cup\{\perp\} \rightarrow B \cup\{\perp\}$ where ⊥ (bottom) indicates that the object function or its argument diverges.

=== Concurrency theory ===
In the calculus of communicating sequential processes (CSP), divergence occurs when a process performs an endless series of hidden actions. For example, consider the following process, defined by CSP notation:
$$Clock = tick \rightarrow Clock$$
The traces of this process are defined as:
$$\operatorname{traces}(Clock) = \{\langle\rangle, \langle tick \rangle, \langle tick,tick \rangle, \ldots \} = \{ tick \}^*$$
Now, consider the following process, which hides the tick event of the Clock process:
$$P = Clock \setminus tick$$
As $P$ cannot do anything other than perform hidden actions forever, it is equivalent to the process that does nothing but diverge, denoted $\mathbf{div}$. One semantic model of CSP is the failures-divergences model, which refines the stable failures model by distinguishing processes based on the sets of traces after which they can diverge.

== See also ==
- Infinite loop
- Termination analysis

== Bibliography ==
Martin, J. M. R.; Jassim, S. A. (1997). "How to Design Deadlock-Free Networks Using CSP and Verification Tools: A Tutorial Introduction". In Bakkers, André W. P. (ed.). Parallel Programming and Java: Proceedings of WoTUG-20. WoTUG-20. Amsterdam: IOS Press. Archived from the original on 8 July 2022.
