= The Computer Journal =

- Discipline: Computer science
- Language: English
- Edited by: Tom Crick

Publication details
- History: 1958–present
- Publisher: Oxford University Press (United Kingdom)
- Frequency: Monthly
- Impact factor: 1.6 (2025)

Standard abbreviations
- ISO 4: Comput. J.

Indexing
- ISSN: 0010-4620 (print); 1460-2067 (web)

Links
- Journal homepage; Online access; Online archive

The Computer Journal is a peer-reviewed scientific journal covering computer science and information systems. Established in 1958, it is one of the oldest computer science research journals. It is published by Oxford University Press on behalf of BCS, The Chartered Institute for IT. The authors of the best paper in each annual volume receive the Wilkes Award from BCS, The Chartered Institute for IT.

== Editors-in-chief ==
The following people have been editor-in-chief:

- 1958–1969 Eric N. Mutch
- 1969–1992 Peter Hammersley
- 1993–2000 C. J. van Rijsbergen
- 2000–2008 Fionn Murtagh
- 2008–2012 Erol Gelenbe
- 2012–2016 Fionn Murtagh
- 2016–2020 Steve Furber
- 2021–present Tom Crick
