= Rüdiger Valk =

German mathematician (born 1945)

Rüdiger Valk (born 5 August 1945) is a German mathematician. From 1976 to 2010 he was Professor for Theoretical Computer Science (Informatics) at the Institut für Informatik (later Fachbereich Informatik) of the University of Hamburg, Germany.

Valk studied mathematics at the University of Bonn (Germany). Supervised by Wilfried Brauer, he continued studying for a postgraduate degree at Bonn and received his PhD in Mathematics in 1974. In 1976 he became Professor for Theoretical Computer Science (Informatics). From 1985 until 2010 he was head of the research group on theoretical foundations of computer science (Theoretische Grundlagen der Informatik, TGI) at the University of Hamburg.

== Research career ==
His early research is characterised by work on topological automata and systems, decision problems and structural properties of Petri nets.

He has published conference and journal articles as well as textbooks.

His later career was devoted to his brainchild Object Petri Nets and the Nets within Nets paradigm; i.e., the idea of using Petri nets as tokens within Petri nets.

During a considerable period of his research career, Rüdiger Valk worked in close collaboration with Carl Adam Petri, the inventor of Petri nets, who held an honorary professorship at the University of Hamburg.

Furthermore, Valk contributed to the debate of how computers affect society, how Informatics should be viewed as a scientific discipline and undertook interdisciplinary research on models of sociology and the derived discipline of socionics as an intersection of sociology and informatics.
