= CPN-AMI =

Software engineering environment

CPN-AMI is a computer-aided software engineering environment based on Petri Net specifications. It provides the ability to specify the behavior of a distributed system—and to evaluate properties such as invariants (preservation of resources), absence of deadlocks, liveness, or temporal logic properties (relations between events in the system).

CPN-AMI relies on AMI-Nets, that are well-formed Petri nets with syntactic facilities. Well Formed Petri nets were jointly elaborated between the University of Paris 6 (Université P. & M. Curie) and the University of Torino in the early 1990s. This Petri net class supports symbolic techniques for model checking, and thus provides a very compressed way to store all states of a system.

Since 2016 CPN-AMI has been listed by the owners as "still available but not maintained any more".

== See also ==
- Well-formed Petri net
- Petriscript
