= Augmented marked graph =

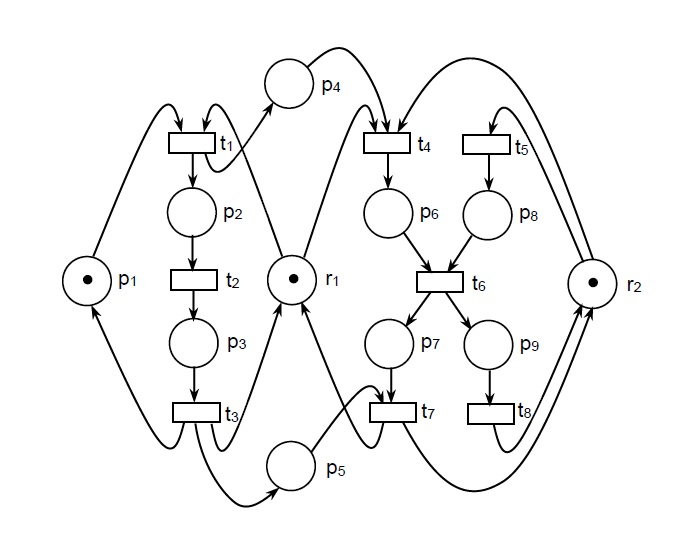
Example of an augmented marked graph

An augmented marked graph is basically a Petri net with a specific set of places called resource places.

If removing these resource places and their associated arcs, it will become a marked graph where every cycle is marked. For each resource place, there are pairs of outgoing and incoming transitions connected by elementary paths.

== Application ==
Augmented marked graphs are often used for modelling systems with shared resources, such as manufacturing systems. Based on the special properties of augmented marked graphs, the properties of the modelled systems, such as liveness, boundedness and reversibility, can be effectively analyzed.
