= Well-formed =

Well-formed or wellformed indicate syntactic correctness and may refer to:

- Well-formedness, quality of linguistic elements that conform to grammar rules
- Well-formed formula, a string that is generated by a formal grammar in logic
- Well-formed element, web design element that is properly designed and ordered
- Well-formed document, XML document that adheres to the syntax rules of the XML 1.0 specification
- Well-formed Petri net, a Petri net class
- Well-formed scale, a class of musical scales
