= CPN Tools =

CPN Tools is a tool for editing, simulating, and analyzing high-level Petri nets. It supports basic Petri nets plus timed Petri nets and colored Petri nets. It has a simulator and a state space analysis tool is included.

CPN Tools is originally developed by the CPN Group at Aarhus University from 2000 to 2010. The main architects behind the tool are Kurt Jensen, Søren Christensen, Lars M. Kristensen, and Michael Westergaard. From the autumn of 2010, CPN Tools is transferred to the AIS group, Eindhoven University of Technology, The Netherlands.

CPN Tools comprises two main components, a graphical editor and a backend simulator component. The graphical editor is written in the academic language, BETA, and the simulator backend is written in the Standard ML variant SML/NJ.

In roughly 2010, CPN Tools maintenance ceased and was transferred to its successor project, CPN IDE.
