= Donatelli =

Donatelli is an Italian surname. Notable people with this name include:

- Augie Donatelli (1914–1990), American baseball umpire
- Carmine Crocco (1830–1905), also known as Carmine Crocco Donatelli, Italian brigand
- Clark Donatelli (born 1965), American ice hockey player and coach
- Denise Donatelli (born 1950), American jazz singer
- Eden Donatelli (born 1970), Canadian short track speed skater and coach
- Fanny Salvini-Donatelli (c. 1815 – 1891), Italian operatic soprano
- Franco Donatelli (1924–1995), Italian comic book artist
- Frank Donatelli (born 1949), American political operative
- Gary Donatelli (born 1951), American television soap opera director
- Raquel Donatelli, American reality television performer
- Susanna Donatelli (born 1960), Italian computer scientist
- Tony Donatelli (born 1984), American soccer player
