= Jean-Yves Béziau =

Logician

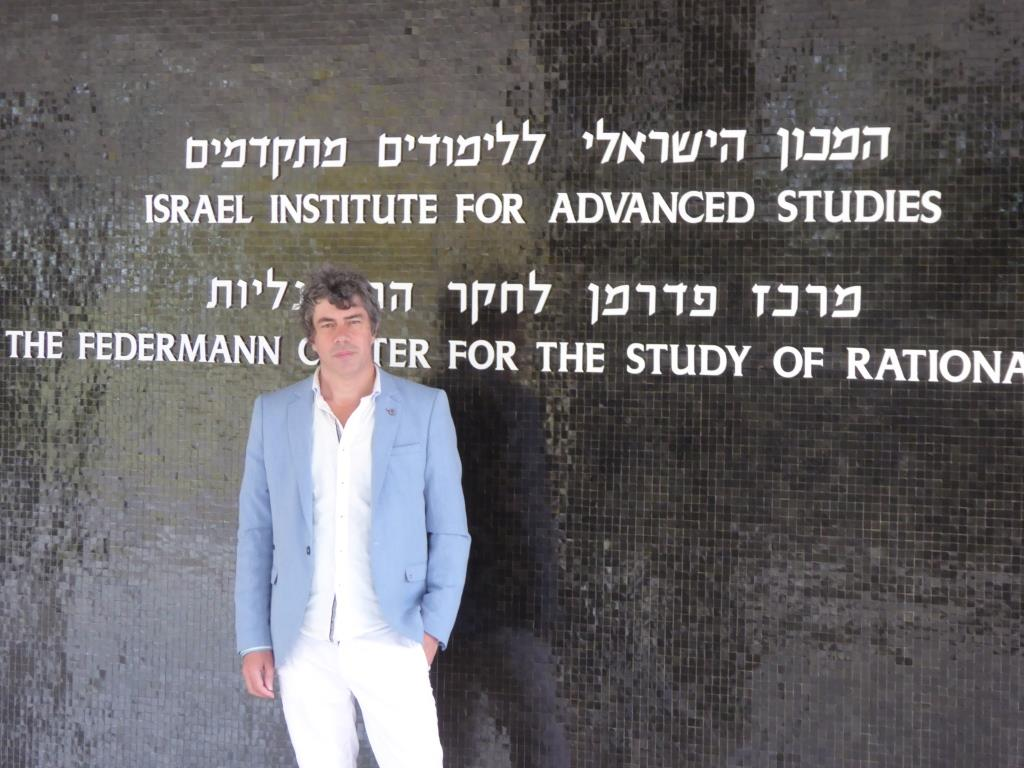
Jean-Yves Béziau in Jerusalem, January 2016

Jean-Yves Beziau (French: [bezjo]; born January 15, 1965, Orléans) is a French-born logician whose research focuses on paraconsistent logic, universal logic, and the square of opposition. He has been affiliated with the Federal University of Rio de Janeiro and the Brazilian National Council for Scientific and Technological Development (CNPq). He is a member and former president of the Brazilian Academy of Philosophy.

Before working in Brazil, Béziau held a position supported by the Swiss National Science Foundation at the University of Neuchâtel, Switzerland, and conducted research at Stanford University in collaboration with Patrick Suppes.

Béziau was an initiator of World Logic Day, first celebrated on 14 January 2019. Following the inaugural celebration, he presented a proposal for its official recognition to Brazil's ambassador to UNESCO in April 2019. The proposal was subsequently supported by Brazil and approved by UNESCO's Executive Board in October 2019. On 26 November 2019, UNESCO's General Conference officially proclaimed 14 January as World Logic Day.

== Career ==
Béziau works in the field of logic—in particular, paraconsistent logic, the square of opposition and universal logic. He holds a Maîtrise in Philosophy from Pantheon-Sorbonne University, a DEA in Philosophy from Pantheon-Sorbonne University, a PhD in Philosophy from the University of São Paulo, a MSc and a PhD in Logic and Foundations of Computer Science from Paris Diderot University.

Béziau is the editor-in-chief of the journal Logica Universalis and of the South American Journal of Logic—an online, open-access journal—as well as of the Springer book series Studies in Universal Logic. He is also the editor of College Publication's book series Logic PhDs

He has launched four major international series of events: UNILOG (World Congress and School on Universal Logic), SQUARE (World Congress on the Square of Opposition), WOCOLOR (World Congress on Logic and Religion), LIQ (Logic in Question).

Later on, Béziau launched SALOME (South American Logic Meeting), PANAFRICAL (Pan African Logic Meeting) and LoChaMo (Logic, Chance and Money).

== Criticism ==
=== Importance of his work ===
Béziau's works concern, among other things, paraconsistent logic, which is a central field of logic, mainly created by his advisor Newton da Costa. Paraconsistent logic rejects the principle of explosion, which states that from a proposition and its negation, one can conclude anything. Béziau organized the third (2003), fifth (2014), and sixth (2022) editions of the World Congress on Paraconsistency and is the founder and editor of the Paraconsistent Newsletter, which he established in 2003.

== Controversy around an article in Synthese ==
In 2015, the academic journal Synthese published an article titled "The Relativity and Universality of Logic" by Jean-Yves Béziau, which drew heavy criticism for containing openly homophobic and sexist statements .

One year later, the Synthese published an apology.

== Selected publications ==
- "What is paraconsistent logic?" In D. Batens et al. (eds.), Frontiers of Paraconsistent Logic, Research Studies Press, Baldock, 2000, pp. 95–111. ISBN 0-86380-253-2
- Handbook of Paraconsistency (ed. with Walter Carnielli and Dov Gabbay). London: College Publication, 2007. ISBN 978-1-904987-73-4
- "Semantic computation of truth based on associations already learned" (with Patrick Suppes), Journal of Applied Logic, 2 (2004), pp. 457–467.
- "From paraconsistent logic to universal logic", Sorites, 12 (2001), pp. 5–32.
- Logica Universalis: Towards a General Theory of Logic (ed.) Basel: Birkhäuser Verlag, 2005, Second Edition 2007. ISBN 3-7643-7259-1
- "Logic is not logic", 'Abstracta' 6 (2010), pp. 73–102.
- "The power of the hexagon", Logica Universalis, 6 (2012), pp. 1–43.
- "History of truth-values", in D.M.Gabbay and J.Woods (eds) Handbook of the History of Logic, Vol. 11 - Logic: a history of its central concepts, Elsevier, Amsterdam, 2012, pp. 233–305
- The Square of Opposition: a General Framework for Cognition (ed. with Gillman Payette). Bern: Peter Lang, 2012. ISBN 978-3-0343-0537-2
- "The new rising of the square of opposition", in J.-Y.Béziau and D.Jacquette (eds), Around and Beyond the Square of Opposition, Birkhäuser, Basel, 2012, pp. 6–24.
- La pointure du symbole (ed.) Paris: Petra, 2014. ISBN 978-2-84743-048-6
- "The relativity and universality of logic", Synthese, 192 (2015), pp 1939–1954.
- "Logical Autobiography 50", in A.Koslow and A.Buchsbaum (eds), The Road to Universal Logic, Vol.2, Birkhäuser, Basel, 2015, pp. 19–104.
- "MANY 1 - A Transversal Imaginative Journey across the Realm of Mathematics", in M.Chakraborty and M.Friend (eds), Special Issue on Mathematical Pluralism of the Journal of Indian Council of Philosophical Research, May 2017, Volume 34, Issue 2, pp 259–287.
- "Being aware of rational animals", in G.Dodig-Crnkovic and R.Giovagnoli (eds), Representation and Reality: Humans, Animals and Machines, Springer International Publishing, Cham, 2017, pp. 319–331.
- "A Chromatic Hexagon of Psychic Dispositions", in M.Silva (ed), How Colours Matter to Philosophy, Springer International Publishing, Cham, 2017, pp. 273–388.
- "An Analogical Hexagon", International Journal of Approximate Reasoning, 94 (2018), pp. 1–17.
- "The Pyramid of Meaning", in J.Ceuppens, H.Smessaert, J. van Craenenbroeck and G.Vanden Wyngaerd (eds), A Coat of Many Colours - D60, Brussels, 2018.
- "An unexpected feature of classical propositional logic in the Tractatus", in G.Mras, P.Weingartner and B.Ritter (eds), Philosophy of Logic and Mathematics: Proceedings of the 41st International Ludwig Wittgenstein Symposium, De Gruyter, Berlin, Munich, Boston, 2019.
- "Is God Paraconsistent?" (with Newton da Costa) in Beyond Faith and Rationality Essays on Logic, Religion and Philosophy, Springer International Publishing, Cham, 2020, pp. 321–333
- "Metalogic, Schopenhauer and Universal Logic", in J.Lemanski (ed), Language, Logic, and Mathematics in Schopenhauer, Birkhäuser, Basel, 2020, pp. 207–257.
- "The Mystery of the Fifth Logical Notion (Alice in the Wonderful Land of Logical Notions)", Studia Humana, Volume 9:3/4 (2020), pp. 19–36.
