= CO-OPN =

The CO-OPN (Concurrent Object-Oriented Petri Nets) specification language is based on both algebraic specifications and algebraic Petri nets formalisms. The former formalism represent the data structures aspects, while the latter stands for the behavioral and concurrent aspects of systems. In order to deal with large specifications some structuring capabilities have been introduced. The object-oriented paradigm has been adopted, which means that a CO-OPN specification is a collection of objects which interact concurrently. Cooperation between the objects is achieved by means of a synchronization mechanism, i.e., each object event may request to be synchronized with some methods (parameterized events) of one or a group of partners by means of a synchronization expression.

A CO-OPN specification consists of a collection of two different modules: the abstract data type modules and the object modules. The abstract data type modules concern the data structure component of the specifications, and many sorted algebraic specifications are used when describing these modules. Furthermore, the object modules represent the concept of encapsulated entities that possess an internal state and provide the exterior with various services. For this second sort of modules, an algebraic net formalism has been adopted. Algebraic Petri nets, a kind of high level nets, are a great improvement over the Petri nets, i.e. Petri nets tokens are replaced with data structures which are described by means of algebraic abstract data types. For managing visibility, both abstract data type modules and object modules are composed of an interface (which allows some operations to be visible from the outside) and a body (which mainly encapsulates the operations properties and some operation which are used for building the model). In the case of the objects modules, the state and the behavior of the objects remain concealed within the body section.

To develop models using the CO-OPN language it is possible to use the COOPNBuilder framework that is an environment composed of a set of tools destinated to the support of concurrent software development based on the CO-OPN language.
