= Susanna Donatelli =

Italian computer scientist

Susanna Donatelli (born 1960) is an Italian computer scientist specializing in discrete-event simulations and their specification, modeling, and analysis using Petri nets, stochastic Petri nets, stochastic process algebras, and the Unified Modeling Language (UML). She is a professor of computer science at the University of Turin.

== Education and career ==
Donatelli earned a laurea in computer science at the University of Turin in 1984, before coming to the US for graduate study. She earned a master's degree in computer engineering at the University of Massachusetts Amherst in 1987, and then returned to the University of Turin for a doctorate in 1989.

She worked as a researcher at the University of Turin from 1990 until 1997, before obtaining an associate professorship there in 1998. In 2002 she took her current position as a full professor at the university.

== Books ==
Donatelli is the coauthor of the book Modelling with Generalized Stochastic Petri Nets, with G. Balbo, Marco Ajmone Marsan, G. Franceschinis, and G. Conte, published with Wiley in 1995. She is also the editor of multiple edited volumes in her research area.
