= International Conference on Reachability Problems =

- Abbreviation: RP
- Discipline: Automata theory, Algebraic structures, logic, verification, computational models

Publication details
- Publisher: Lecture Notes in Computer Science, Springer
- History: 2007–
- Frequency: annual

RP, the International Conference on Reachability Problems is an annual academic conference in the field of computer science.

The RP is specifically aimed at gathering together scholars from diverse disciplines and backgrounds interested in reachability problems that appear in

- Algebraic structures
- Automata Theory and Formal languages
- Concurrency and Distributed computations
- Decision Procedures in Computational models
- Hybrid systems
- Logic and Model checking
- Formal verification of Finite and Infinite-state Systems
- Algorithmic game theory

Topics of interest include (but are not limited to): Reachability problems in infinite state systems, rewriting systems, dynamical and hybrid systems; reachability problems in logic and verification; reachability analysis in different computational models, counter timed/ cellular/ communicating automata; Petri nets; computational aspects of algebraic structures (semigroups, groups and rings); frontiers between decidable and undecidable reachability problems; predictability in iterative maps and new computational paradigms.

== History of the Workshop ==
- RP'22 in Kaiserslautern, Germany, LNCS proceedings, Springer Verlag
- RP'21 in Liverpool, UK, LNCS proceedings, volume 13035, Springer Verlag
- RP'20 in Paris, France, LNCS proceedings, volume 12448, Springer Verlag
- RP'19 in Brussels, Belgium, LNCS proceedings, volume 11674, Springer Verlag
- RP'18 in Marseille, France, LNCS proceedings, volume 11123, Springer Verlag
- RP'17 in London, UK, LNCS proceedings, Springer Verlag
- RP'16 in Aalborg, Denmark, LNCS proceedings, Springer Verlag
- RP'15 in Warsaw, Poland, LNCS proceedings, Springer Verlag
- RP'14 in Oxford, UK, LNCS proceedings, Springer Verlag
- RP'13 in Uppsala, Sweden, LNCS proceedings, Springer Verlag
- RP'12 in Bordeaux, France, LNCS proceedings, Volume 7550/2012, Springer Verlag
- RP'11 in Genova, Italy, LNCS proceedings, Volume 6945/2011, Springer Verlag
- RP'10 in Brno, Czech Republic, LNCS proceedings, Volume 6227/2010, Springer Verlag
- RP'09 in Palaiseau, France, LNCS proceedings, Volume 5797/2009, Springer Verlag
- RP'08 in Liverpool, UK, ENTCS proceedings, Volume 223, Elsevier
- RP'07 in Turku, Finland, TUCS General Publication Serie, Volume 45, Turku Centre for Computer Science
