= World Philosophy Day =

International day proclaimed by UNESCO

- Type: Secular
- Date: Third Thursday in November
- 2024 date: November 21
- 2025 date: November 20
- 2026 date: November 19
- 2027 date: November 18
- Frequency: annual

World Philosophy Day is an international day proclaimed by UNESCO to be celebrated every 3rd Thursday of November. It was first celebrated on 21 November 2002.

By celebrating World Philosophy Day each year, on the third Thursday of November, UNESCO underlines the enduring value of philosophy for the development of human thought, for each culture and for each individual. UNESCO has always been closely linked to philosophy, not speculative or normative philosophy, but critical questioning which enables it to give meaning to life and action in the international context.

In establishing World Philosophy Day in 2002, UNESCO’s General Conference highlighted the importance of this discipline, especially for young people, underlining that "philosophy is a discipline that encourages critical and independent thought and is capable of working towards a better understanding of the world and promoting tolerance and peace". UNESCO's General Conference was convinced that "the institutionalisation of Philosophy Day at UNESCO as 'World Philosophy Day' would win recognition for and give strong impetus to philosophy and, in particular, to the teaching of philosophy in the world".

== See also ==
- World Logic Day
