= Joseph Goguen =

American computer scientist

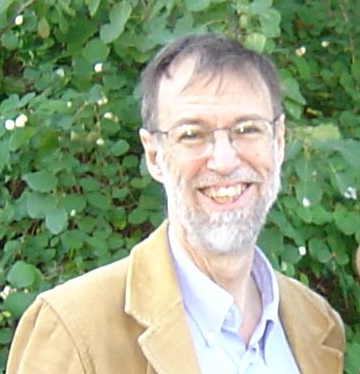
- Joseph Goguen in 2004
- Born: Joseph Amadee Goguen; June 28, 1941
- Died: July 3, 2006 (aged 65); San Diego, California, U.S.
- Education: Harvard University; University of California, Berkeley
- Known for: Goguen categories Formal specification Algebraic semantics OBJ family of programming languages Institution theory Institutional model theory Consciousness studies
- Spouse: Ryoko Amadee Goguen
- Scientific career
- Fields: Computer science
- Workplaces: University of California, Berkeley; University of Chicago; IBM Research; University of California, Los Angeles; SRI International; University of Oxford; University of Edinburgh; University of California, San Diego
- Doctoral advisor: Hans-Joachim Bremermann; Lotfi Zadeh

Joseph Amadee Goguen (/ˈɡoʊɡən/ GOH-gən; June 28, 1941 – July 3, 2006) was an American computer scientist. He was professor of Computer Science at the University of California and University of Oxford, and held research positions at IBM and SRI International.

In the 1960s, along with Lotfi Zadeh, Goguen was one of the earliest researchers in fuzzy logic and made profound contributions to fuzzy set theory. In the 1970s Goguen's work was one of the earliest approaches to the algebraic characterisation of abstract data types and he originated and helped develop the OBJ family of programming languages. He was author of A Categorical Manifesto and founder and Editor-in-Chief of the Journal of Consciousness Studies. His development of institution theory impacted the field of universal logic. Standard implication in product fuzzy logic is often called "Goguen implication". Goguen categories are named after him.

He was married to Ryoko Amadee Goguen, who is a composer, pianist, and vocalist.

== Education and academic career ==
Goguen received his bachelor's degree in mathematics from Harvard University in 1963, and his PhD in mathematics from the University of California, Berkeley in 1968, where he was a student of the founder of fuzzy set theory, Lotfi Zadeh.

He taught at UC Berkeley, the University of Chicago and University of California, Los Angeles, where he was a full professor of computer science. He held a Research Fellowship in the Mathematical Sciences at the IBM Watson Research Center, where he organised the "ADJ" group. He also visited the University of Edinburgh in Scotland on three Senior Visiting Fellowships.

From 1979 to 1988, Goguen worked at SRI International in Menlo Park, California. From 1988 to 1996, he was a professor at the Oxford University Computing Laboratory (now the Department of Computer Science, University of Oxford) in England and a Fellow at St Anne's College, Oxford. In 1996 he became professor of Computer Science at the University of California, San Diego.

== Research areas ==
Goguen's research interests included category theory (a branch of mathematics), software engineering, fuzzy logic, algebraic semantics, user interface design, algebraic semiotics, and the social and ethical aspects of science and technology. In the preface to a book dedicated to Goguen, Futatsugi, Jouannaud and Meseguer stated that Goguen's work changed the way we think about concepts such as data types, programming languages and software specification.

In a review of Goguen's work on fuzzy sets Radim Belohlavek wrote that In the early stages of the development of fuzzy systems, Goguen made profound contributions with lasting influence. Lotfi Zadeh viewed Goguen's 1968 approach to "The Logic of Inexact Concepts" as seminal in the field of fuzzy logic. Goguen's PhD dissertation "Categories of fuzzy sets" was the first work to apply category theory to fuzzy logic, and led to Goguen categories being named after him.

Goguen's research in the 1970s was one of the earliest approaches to the characterisation of computational automata from a categorical perspective. Goguen's research with Thatcher, Wagner and Wright (also in the 1970s) was one of the earliest works to formalise the algebraic basis for data abstraction.

In the early 1990s Goguen and Rod Burstall developed the theory of institutions, a category-theoretic description of logical systems in computer science. Institution theory impacted the development of universal logic and became one of its most studied aspects. The term "Carnapian Goguenism" is used to refer to the application of institutions to ontologies.

Goguen also studied the philosophy of computation and information, formal methods (especially hidden algebra and theorem proving), and relational and functional programming. He wrote a retrospective of his work and its context, Tossing Algebraic Flowers Down the Great Divide.

== Personal views ==
Goguen was a practitioner of Tibetan Buddhism. Specifically, since the early 1970s he was a student of Chögyam Trungpa and, after his death in 1987, of his son Sakyong Mipham. During the late 1970s and early 1980s, he was a faculty member of the science program at the Naropa Institute in Boulder, Colorado.

== Books ==
- Goguen, Joseph A., Algebraic Semantics of Imperative Programs, MIT Press (1996). ISBN 978-0262071727.
- Goguen, Joseph A., and Malcolm, Grant, Software Engineering with OBJ, Springer (2000). ISBN 978-1441949653.
- Kokichi Futatsugi et al., Algebra, Meaning, and Computation: Essays Dedicated to Joseph A. Goguen, Springer (2006). ISBN 978-3540354628.

== Selected publications ==
- Goguen, J.A., "L-fuzzy sets", Journal of Mathematical Analysis and Applications 18 (1): 145–174 (1967).
- Goguen, J.A., "The logic of inexact concepts", Synthese 19 (3/4): 325–373 (1969).
- Goguen, J.A. and J.W. Thatcher. "Initial algebra semantics", in Proceedings, Fifteenth Symposium on Switching and Automata Theory, IEEE, pages 63–77 (1974).
- Goguen, J.A., J. Thatcher, and E. Wagner. "An initial algebra approach to the specification, correctness and implementation of abstract data types", in Current Trends in Programming Methodology, vol. IV: Data Structuring, Raymond T. Yeh (Ed.), Prentice Hall, pp. 80–149 (1978).
- Goguen, J.A., "A Categorical Manifesto", Mathematical Structures in Computer Science 1 (1): 49–67 (1991).
- Goguen, J.A. (Ed.), Art and the Brain, Journal of Consciousness Studies 6 (6/7) (1999).

== See also ==
- List of computer scientists
