= Prioritised Petri net =

A Prioritised Petri net is a structure (PN, Π) where PN is a Petri net and Π is a priority function that maps transitions into non-negative natural numbers representing their priority level

The enabled transitions with a given priority k always fire before any other enabled transition with priority j<k.

== Sources ==
- B. Hruz, M.C.Zhou, "Modeling and Control of Discrete-event Dynamic Systems with Petri Nets and Other Tool", Advanced Control and signal processing, Springer, 2007
