= World Logic Day =

International day proclaimed by UNESCO

- Type: Secular
- Date: 14 January
- Next time: 14 January 2027
- Frequency: annual
- Started by: Logica Universalis Association, UNESCO, CIPSH
- Related to: World Philosophy Day

World Logic Day is an international day proclaimed by UNESCO in association with the International Council for Philosophy and Human Sciences (CIPSH) in November 2019 to be celebrated on 14 January every year. It was first celebrated on 14 January 2019, before the UNESCO declaration. World Logic Day intends to bring the intellectual history, conceptual significance and practical implications of logic to the attention of interdisciplinary science communities and the broader public.

== Date ==
The date chosen to celebrate World Logic Day, 14 January, corresponds to the date of death of Kurt Gödel and the date of birth of Alfred Tarski, two of the most prominent logicians of the twentieth century.

== Proclamation ==
The proclamation of World Logic Day was proposed to the UNESCO Executive Board in the middle of 2019. It was discussed and adopted at the 207th session of the UNESCO Executive Board in October 2019 and proposed to the 40th General Conference of UNESCO. On 26 November 2019, the 40th General Conference proclaimed 14 January to be World Logic Day, coordinated by CIPSH.

== Celebrations ==
The Logica Universalis Association, an informal meta-association promoting logic, promoted the celebration of World Logic Day 2019 by encouraging logicians worldwide to organise independent events on 14 January 2019. The success of this informal first World Logic Day formed part of the deliberations of the 40th UNESCO General Conference in November 2019 which led to the formal proclamation by UNESCO. On the first World Logic Day after the UNESCO proclamation, the Director-General of UNESCO, Audrey Azoulay, issued a statement highlighting the importance of logic:

In the twenty-first century—indeed, now more than ever—the discipline of logic is a particularly timely one, utterly vital to our societies and economies. Computer science and information and communications technology, for example, are rooted in logical and algorithmic reasoning.

The first two World Logic Days (in 2019 and 2020) were informally organised and consisted of approximately sixty events in about thirty countries. After the second World Logic Day, the coordination of the celebrations was taken over by CIPSH: World Logic Days 2021, 2022, and 2023 had between sixty and eighty events each. In addition to events, World Logic Day 2022 was celebrated with a special puzzle The two tribes of If by Alex Bellos on the Guardian website.

The 2025 edition of the World Logic Day featured an online roundtable titled "Logic in All its Dimensions" organized by the Logica Universalis Association (LUA), highlighting the multifaceted applications of logic across different fields.
