= Process architecture =

Structural design of general process systems

Process architecture is the structural design of general process systems. It applies to fields such as computers (software, hardware, networks, etc.), business processes (enterprise architecture, policy and procedures, logistics, project management, etc.), and any other process system of varying degrees of complexity.

== Processes and Process Systems ==
Processes are defined as having inputs, outputs and the energy required to transform inputs to outputs. The use of energy during transformation also implies a passage of time: a process takes real time to perform its associated action. A process also requires space for input/output objects and transforming objects to exist.

A process system is a specialized system of processes. Processes are composed of processes. Complex processes are made up of several processes that are in turn made up of several processes. This results in an overall structural hierarchy of abstraction. If the process system is studied hierarchically, it is easier to understand and manage; therefore, process architecture requires the ability to consider process systems hierarchically. Graphical modeling of process architectures is considered by dualistic Petri nets. Mathematical consideration of process architectures may be found in CCS and the π-calculus.

== Infrastructure and Suprastructure ==
The structure of a process system, or its architecture, can be viewed as a dualistic relationship of its infrastructure and suprastructure. The infrastructure describes a process system's component parts and their interactions. The suprastructure considers the super system of which the process system is a part. (Suprastructure should not be confused with superstructure, which is actually part of the infrastructure built for (external) support. As one traverses the process architecture from one level of abstraction to the next, infrastructure becomes the basis for suprastructure and vice versa as one looks within a system or without.

== Requirements ==
Requirements for a process system are derived at every hierarchical level. Black-box requirements for a system come from its suprastructure. Customer requirements are black-box requirements near, if not at, the top of a process architecture's hierarchy. White-box requirements, such as engineering rules, programming syntax, etc., come from the process system's infrastructure.

Process systems are a dualistic phenomenon of change/no-change or form/transform and as such, are well-suited to being modeled by the bipartite Petri nets modeling system and in particular, process-class dualistic Petri nets where processes can be simulated in real time and space and studied hierarchically.

== See also ==
- Complex system
- Enterprise information security architecture
- Flowchart
- Information architecture
- Method engineering
- Petri net
- Process calculus
- Process engineering
- Process modeling
- Process theory
- System of systems
- Systems architecture
- Systems theory
- Workflow
