= Universal logic =

Subfield of logic that studies the features common to all logical systems

Universal logic is the field of logic that studies the features common to all logical systems, aiming to be to logic what universal algebra is to algebra. A number of approaches to universal logic have been proposed since the twentieth century, using model theoretical, and categorical approaches.

== History and development ==
The roots of universal logic as general theory of logical systems may go as far back as some work of Alfred Tarski in the early twentieth century and Paul Herz in 1922, but the modern notion was first presented in the 1990s by Swiss logician Jean-Yves Béziau. The term 'universal logic' has also been separately used by logicians such as Richard Sylvan and Ross Brady to refer to a new type of (weak) relevant logic.

In the context defined by Béziau, three main approaches to universal logic have been explored in depth:

- An abstract model theory system axiomatized by Jon Barwise,
- a topological/categorical approach based on sketches (sometimes called categorical model theory),
- a categorical approach originating in Computer Science based on Goguen and Burstall's notion of institution.

While logic has been studied for centuries, Mossakowski et al commented in 2007 that "it is embarrassing that there is no widely acceptable formal definition of "a logic". These approaches to universal logic thus aim to address and formalize the nature of what may be called 'logic' as a form of "sound reasoning".

== Community ==
Since 2005, Béziau has been organizing world congresses and schools on universal logic.

- First World Congress and School on Universal Logic, 26 March–3 April 2005, Montreux, Switzerland. Participants included Béziau, Dov Gabbay, and David Makinson. (Secret Speaker: Saul Kripke.)
- Second World Congress and School on Universal Logic, 16–22 August 2007, Xi'an, China.
- Third World Congress and School on Universal Logic, 18–25 April 2010, Lisbon, Portugal. (Secret Speaker: Jaakko Hintikka.)
- Fourth World Congress and School on Universal Logic, 29 March–7 April 2013, Rio de Janeiro, Brazil.
- Fifth World Congress and School on Universal Logic, 20–30 June 2015, Istanbul, Turkey.
- Sixth World Congress and School on Universal Logic, 16–26 June 2018, Vichy, France.
- Seventh World Congress and School on Universal Logic, 1–11 April 2022, Crete.

== Publications in the field ==
A journal dedicated to the field, Logica Universalis, with Béziau as editor-in-chief started to be published by Birkhäuser Basel (an imprint of Springer) in 2007. Springer also started to publish a book series on the topic, Studies in Universal Logic, with Béziau as series editor.

An anthology titled Universal Logic was published in 2012, giving a new light on the subject.

== See also ==
- Abstract algebraic logic
- Conceptions of logic
- Category theory
