= Conceptions of logic =

The history of logic as a subject has been characterised by many disputes over what the topic deals with, and the main article 'Logic' has as a result been hesitant to commit to a particular definition of logic. This article surveys various definitions of the subject that have appeared over the centuries through to modern times, and puts them in context as reflecting rival conceptions of the subject.

== Rival conceptions of logic ==
In the period of scholastic philosophy, logic was predominantly Aristotelian. Following the decline of scholasticism, logic was thought of as an affair of ideas by early modern philosophers such as John Locke and David Hume. Immanuel Kant took this one step further. He begins with the assumption of the empiricist philosophers, that all knowledge whatsoever is internal to the mind, and that we have no genuine knowledge of 'things in themselves'. Furthermore, (an idea he seemed to have got from Hume) the material of knowledge is a succession of separate ideas which have no intrinsic connection and thus no real unity. In order that these disparate sensations be brought into some sort of order and coherence, there must be an internal mechanism in the mind which provides the forms by which we think, perceive and reason.

Kant calls these forms Categories (in a somewhat different sense than employed by the Aristotelian logicians), of which he claims there are twelve:

- Quantity (Singular, Particular, Universal)
- Quality (Affirmative, Negative, Infinite)
- Relation (Categorical, Hypothetical, Disjunctive)
- Modality (Problematic, Assertoric, Apodictic)

This conception of logic eventually developed into an extreme form of psychologism espoused in the nineteenth century by Benno Erdmann and others.

Another view of logic espoused by Hegel and others of his school (such as F. H. Bradley, Bernard Bosanquet and others), was the 'Logic of the Pure Idea'. The central feature of this view is the identification of Logic and Metaphysics. The Universe has its origin in the categories of thought. Thought in its fullest development becomes the Absolute Idea, a divine mind evolving itself in the development of the Universe.

In the modern period, Gottlob Frege said "Just as 'beautiful' points the way for aesthetics and 'good' for ethics, so do words like 'true' for logic", and went on to characterise the distinctive task of logic "to discern the laws of truth". Later, W. V. O. Quine (1940, pp. 2–3) defined logic in terms of a logical vocabulary, which in turn is identified by an argument that the many particular vocabularies — Quine mentions geological vocabulary — are used in their particular discourses together with a common, topic-independent kernel of terms. These terms, then, constitute the logical vocabulary, and the logical truths are those truths common to all particular topics.

Thomas Hofweber (2004) lists several definitions of logic, and goes on to claim that all definitions of logic are of one of four sorts. These are that logic is the study of: (i) artificial formal structures, (ii) sound inference (e.g., Poinsot), (iii) tautologies (e.g., Watts), or (iv) general features of thought (e.g., Frege). He argues then that these definitions are related to each other, but do not exhaust each other, and that an examination of formal ontology shows that these mismatches between rival definitions are due to tricky issues in ontology.

== Informal and colloquial definitions ==
Arranged in approximate chronological order.

- The tool for distinguishing between the true and the false (Averroes).
- The science of reasoning, teaching the way of investigating unknown truth in connection with a thesis (Robert Kilwardby).
- The art whose function is to direct the reason lest it err in the manner of inferring or knowing (John Poinsot).
- The art of conducting reason well in knowing things (Antoine Arnauld).
- The right use of reason in the inquiry after truth (Isaac Watts).
- The Science, as well as the Art, of reasoning (Richard Whately).
- The science of the operations of the understanding which are subservient to the estimation of evidence (John Stuart Mill).
- The science of the laws of discursive thought (James McCosh).
- The science of the most general laws of truth (Gottlob Frege).
- An explication or explicitation of our reasoning practices (Robert Brandom).

== See also ==
- Universal logic
