= OBJ (programming language) =

OBJ is a programming language family introduced by Joseph Goguen in 1976, and further worked on by Jose Meseguer.

== Overview ==
It is a family of declarative "ultra high-level" languages. It features abstract types, generic modules, subsorts (subtypes with multiple inheritance), pattern-matching modulo equations, E-strategies (user control over laziness), module expressions (for combining modules), theories and views (for describing module interfaces) for the massively parallel RRM (rewrite rule machine).

Members of the OBJ family of languages include CafeOBJ, Eqlog, FOOPS, Kumo, Maude, OBJ2, and OBJ3.

== OBJ2 ==
OBJ2 is a programming language with Clear-like parametrised modules and a functional system based on equations.

== OBJ3 ==
OBJ3 is a version of OBJ based on order-sorted rewriting. OBJ3 is agent-oriented and runs on Kyoto Common Lisp AKCL.

== See also ==
- Automated theorem proving
- Comparison of programming languages
- Formal methods
