= Thomas Hofweber =

German American philosopher

Education
- Education: LMU Munich (MA); Stanford University (PhD)
- Doctoral advisor: Solomon Feferman; John Perry

Philosophical work
- Era: Contemporary philosophy
- Region: Western philosophy
- School: Analytic
- Institutions: University of North Carolina at Chapel Hill
- Main interests: Metaphysics, meta-ontology, philosophy of language, philosophy of mathematics
- Notable ideas: Alethic idealism without ontological idealism Harmony of thought and reality

Thomas Hofweber (/ˈhɒfˌveɪbər/; German: [ˈhoːfˌveːbɐ]) is a German-American philosopher and professor at the University of North Carolina at Chapel Hill. He is a specialist in metaphysics, the philosophy of language, and the philosophy of mathematics.

== Education and career ==
Hofweber completed an MA in Philosophy, with minors in Logic and Mathematics, at LMU Munich in 1994. He earned his PhD in Philosophy from Stanford University in 1999. His dissertation, titled Ontology and Objectivity, was co-supervised by Solomon Feferman and John Perry. He is currently the William R. Kenan Jr. Distinguished Professor of Philosophy at the University of North Carolina at Chapel Hill, where he has taught since 2003. Prior to that, he was an assistant professor at the University of Michigan from 1999 to 2003.

Hofweber won a Templeton Foundation fellowship in 2014 for the project "Intellectual Humility and the Limits of Conceptual Representation".

== Philosophical work ==
His work often addresses the interface between formal semantics, metaphysical structure, and logical analysis, with particular interest in how ordinary and mathematical language reflect ontological commitments. He argues that alethic idealism is compatible with the rejection of ontological idealism; that is, reality may be conceptually structured or constrained by human thought even though the objects that constitute it are mind-independent.

== Bibliography ==
- Ontology and the Ambitions of Metaphysics (Oxford University Press, 2016)
- Idealism and the Harmony of Thought and Reality (Oxford University Press, 2023)

== See also ==
- Conceptions of logic
