= Petri Net Markup Language =

Petri Net Markup Language (PNML) is an interchange format aimed at enabling Petri net tools to exchange Petri net models. PNML is an XML-based syntax for high-level Petri nets, which is being designed as a standard interchange format for Petri net tools. It will end up being the second part of the ISO standard ISO/IEC 15909. PNML grammar is publicly available on its reference site.

The first part of this international standard, provides the mathematical definitions for high-level Petri nets. These definitions are called the semantic model.

It also provides the graphical form definition, known as High-level Petri Net Graph (HLPNG), and its mapping to the semantic model.

As of December 2004, the first part is an international standard.
