= Kurt Jensen (computer scientist) =

Kurt Jensen (born 1950) is a Danish computer science professor at Aarhus University has been writing peer-reviewed papers since 1976, and by 2014 had an h-index of 32. He is best known for his research into coloured Petri nets.
