= Hidden algebra =

Hidden algebra provides a formal semantics for use in the field of software engineering, especially for concurrent distributed object systems. It supports correctness proofs.

Hidden algebra was studied by Joseph Goguen. It handles features of large software-based systems, including concurrency, distribution, nondeterminism, and local states. It also handled object-oriented features like classes, subclasses (inheritance), attributes, and methods. Hidden algebra generalizes process algebra and transition system approaches.
