= Slicing Petri nets =

Petri net (PN) slicing is a syntactic technique used to reduce a PN model based on a given criterion. Informally, a slicing criterion could be a property for which a PN model is analyzed or is a set of places, transitions, or both. A sliced part constitutes only that part of a PN model that may affect the criteria.

== Background ==
The term slicing was coined by M. Weiser in the context of program debugging. According to Wieser, a program slice is a reduced, executable program that can be obtained from a program P based on the variables of interest and line number by removing statements such that program slicing replicates part of the behavior of the program. The term was later adapted to the context of Petri nets and for other classes of Petri nets such as Algebraic Petri nets.

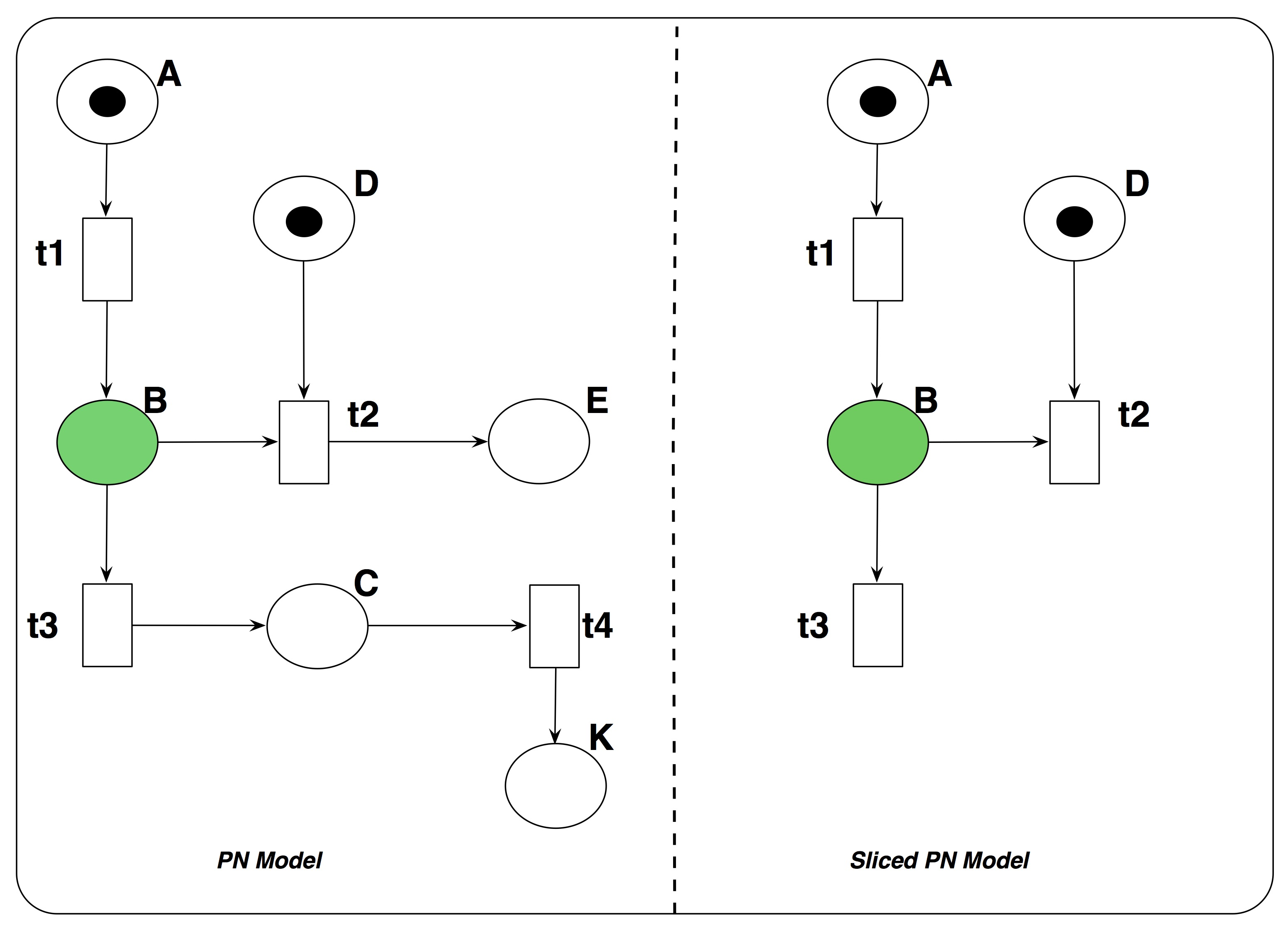
Exampleslice
