= Stochastic Petri net =

Stochastic Petri nets are a form of Petri net where the transitions fire after a probabilistic delay determined by a random variable.

== Definition ==
A stochastic Petri net is a five-tuple SPN = (P, T, F, M_{0}, Λ) where:

1. P is a set of states, called places.
2. T is a set of transitions.
3. F where F ⊂ (P × T) ∪ (T × P) is a set of flow relations called "arcs" between places and transitions (and between transitions and places).
4. M_{0} is the initial marking.
5. Λ = is the array of firing rates λ associated with the transitions. The firing rate, a random variable, can also be a function λ(M) of the current marking.

== Correspondence to Markov process ==
The reachability graph of stochastic Petri nets can be mapped directly to a Markov process. It satisfies the Markov property, since its states depend only on the current marking. Each state in the reachability graph is mapped to a state in the Markov process, and the firing of a transition with firing rate λ corresponds to a Markov state transition with probability λ.

== Software tools ==
- Platform Independent Petri net Editor
- ORIS Tool
- GreatSPN
