= Process theory =

A process theory is a system of ideas which explains how an entity changes and develops. Process theories are often contrasted with variance theories, that is, systems of ideas that explain the variance in a dependent variable based on one or more independent variables. While process theories focus on how something happens, variance theories focus on why something happens. Examples of process theories include evolution by natural selection, continental drift and the nitrogen cycle.

== Process theory archetypes ==
Process theories come in four common archetypes. Evolutionary process theories explain change in a population through variation, selection and retention—much like biological evolution. In a dialectic process theory, "stability and change are explained by reference to the balance of power between opposing entities" (p. 517). In a teleological process theory, an agent "constructs an envisioned end state, takes action to reach it and monitors the progress" (p. 518). In a lifecycle process theory, "the trajectory to the final end state is prefigured and requires a particular historical sequence of events" (p. 515); that is, change always conforms to the same series of activities, stages, phases, like a caterpillar transforming into a butterfly.

== Applications and examples ==
Process theories are important in management and software engineering. Process theories are used to explain how people are motivated and how decisions are made, how software is designed and how software processes are improved.

Motivation theories can be classified broadly into two different perspectives: content and process theories.

- Content theories deal with “what” motivates people and it is concerned with individual needs and goals. Maslow, Alderfer, Herzberg and McClelland studied motivation from a “content” perspective.
- Process theories deal with the "process" of motivation and are concerned with "how" motivation occurs. Vroom, Porter and Lawler (see: Victor Vroom#Theory of Expectancy), John Stacey Adams and Edwin Locke studied motivation from a "process" perspective.

Process theories are also used in education, psychology, geology and many other fields; however, they are not always called "process theories".

== See also ==
- Interactions of actors theory
- Process-oriented psychology
- Process philosophy
- Process architecture
