= Institutional model theory =

This page is about the concept in mathematical logic. For the concepts in sociology, see Institutional theory and Institutional logic.

In mathematical logic, institutional model theory generalizes a large portion of first-order model theory to an arbitrary logical system, formalized as institutions.

== Overview ==
The notion of "logical system" here is formalized as an institution. Institutions constitute a model-oriented meta-theory on logical systems similar to how the theory of rings and modules constitute a meta-theory for classical linear algebra. Another analogy can be made with universal algebra versus groups, rings, modules etc. By abstracting away from the realities of the actual conventional logics, it can be noticed that institution theory comes in fact closer to the realities of non-conventional logics.

Institutional model theory analyzes and generalizes classical model-theoretic notions and results, such as

- elementary diagrams
- elementary embeddings
- ultraproducts, Los' theorem
- saturated models
- axiomatizability
- varieties, Birkhoff axiomatizability
- Craig interpolation
- Robinson consistency
- Beth definability
- Gödel's completeness theorem

For each concept and theorem, the infrastructure and properties required are analyzed and formulated as conditions on institutions, thus providing a detailed insight to which properties of first-order logic they rely on and how much they can be generalized to other logics.
