= Logica Universalis =

- Discipline: Universal logic
- Language: English
- Edited by: Jean-Yves Béziau

Publication details
- History: 2007–present
- Publisher: Birkhäuser Verlag
- Frequency: Biannually

Standard abbreviations
- ISO 4: Log. Univers.

Indexing
- ISSN: 1661-8297 (print); 1661-8300 (web)
- LCCN: 2008205590
- OCLC no.: 229993821

Links
- Journal homepage

Logica Universalis is a peer-reviewed academic journal which covers research related to universal logic. The first issue appeared in 2007.
