= Carl Adam Petri =

German mathematician (1926–2010)

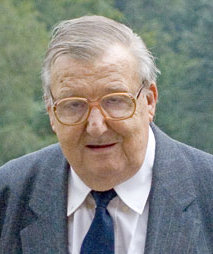
- Born: 12 July 1926; Leipzig, Weimar Republic
- Died: 2 July 2010 (aged 83); Siegburg, Germany
- Education: Leibniz University Hannover, Technische Universität Darmstadt
- Known for: Petri nets
- Awards: Cross of Merit, First class (1988); Konrad Zuse Medal (1993); Werner von Siemens Ring (1996); IEEE Computer Pioneer Award (2008)
- Scientific career
- Fields: Mathematics, Computer science
- Workplaces: University of Bonn

Carl Adam Petri (12 July 1926 in Leipzig – 2 July 2010 in Siegburg) was a German mathematician and computer scientist.

== Life and work ==
Petri net example

Petri created his major scientific contribution, the concept of the Petri net, in 1939 at the age of 13, for the purpose of describing chemical processes. In 1941, his father told him about Konrad Zuse's work on computing machines, and Carl Adam started building his own analog computer.

After earning his Abitur at Thomasschule in 1944, he was drafted into the Wehrmacht. He was taken into British captivity until 1949, when he departed England.

Petri started studying mathematics at the Technische Hochschule Hannover (today, the Leibniz University Hannover) in 1950. He documented Petri nets in 1962 as part of his dissertation, Kommunikation mit Automaten (Communication with automata). From 1959 until 1962 he worked at the University of Bonn and received his PhD degree in 1962 from the Technische Universität Darmstadt. From 1963 to 1968, he established and directed the computing centre of Bonn University. In 1968, he became head of Forschungsinstitut für Informationssysteme of the newly founded Gesellschaft für Mathematik und Datenverarbeitung (GMD). He retired in 1991.

In 1988, Petri became honorary professor of the University of Hamburg. He was a member of the Academia Europaea.

Petri's work significantly advanced the fields of parallel computing and distributed computing, and it helped define the modern studies of complex systems and workflow management systems. His contributions have been in the broader area of network theory, which includes coordination models and theories of interaction, and eventually led to the formal study of software connectors.

== Books, papers, and presentations ==
- 1962
  - Kommunikation mit Automaten (Dissertation) by Carl Adam Petri
- 1976
  - Nicht-sequentielle Prozesse (Work report) by Carl Adam Petri
  - Kommunikationsdisziplinen (Internal report) by Carl Adam Petri
- 1977
  - General net theory (from "Computing System Design: Proceedings of the Joint IBM University of Newcastle upon Tyne Seminar") by Carl Adam Petri
  - Communication disciplines (from "Computing System Design: Proceedings of the Joint IBM University of Newcastle upon Tyne Seminar") by Carl Adam Petri
- 1979
  - Concurrency as a basis of systems thinking (from "Proceedings of the 5th Scandinavian Logic Symposium") by Carl Adam Petri
  - Ansätze zur Organisationstheorie rechnergestützter Informationssysteme (Book) by Carl Adam Petri
- 1980
  - Concurrency (from "Net Theory and Applications, Proceedings of the Advanced Course on General Net Theory of Processes and Systems, Hamburg, October 8–19, 1979") by Carl Adam Petri
  - Introduction to General Net Theory (from "Net Theory and Applications, Proc. of the Advanced Course on General Net Theory of Processes and Systems, Hamburg, 1979") by Carl Adam Petri
- 1982
  - State-Transition Structures in Physics and Computation (article in "International Journal of Theoretical Physics") by Carl Adam Petri
- 1987
  - Concurrency Theory (from "Petri Nets: Central Models and Their Properties, Advances in Petri Nets 1986, Part I, Proceedings of an Advanced Course, Bad Honnef, September 1986") by Carl Adam Petri
- 1996
  - Nets, Time and Space (from "Theoretical Computer Science") by Carl Adam Petri
- 1997
  - Ansprache anläßlich der Verleihung des Werner-von-Siemens-Rings by Carl Adam Petri
- 2008
  - Petri Nets by Carl Adam Petri and Wolfgang Reisig

== Awards ==
Petri was honoured with the following awards:

- 1993: Konrad Zuse Medal of the Gesellschaft für Informatik.
- 1997: Werner von Siemens Ring, a prestigious German award in technical sciences.
- 1999: Doctorate Honoris Causa from the Universidad de Zaragoza
- 2003: honoured by Her Majesty the Queen of the Netherlands with the title Commander in the Order of the Netherlands Lion.
- 2007: honoured for his lifetime achievements by the "Academy of Transdisciplinary Learning and Advanced Studies (ATLAS)" with an "Academy Gold Medal of Honour".
- 2008: Computer Pioneer Award from the IEEE for his inspiration of Petri nets.

== See also ==
- Petri net
- Discrete Event Dynamic Systems (DEDS)
