= Cousot =

Cousot is a surname. Notable people with the surname include:

- Patrick Cousot (born 1948), French computer scientist
- Radhia Cousot (1947–2014), French computer scientist
