= Radhia Cousot =

French computer scientist (1947–2014)

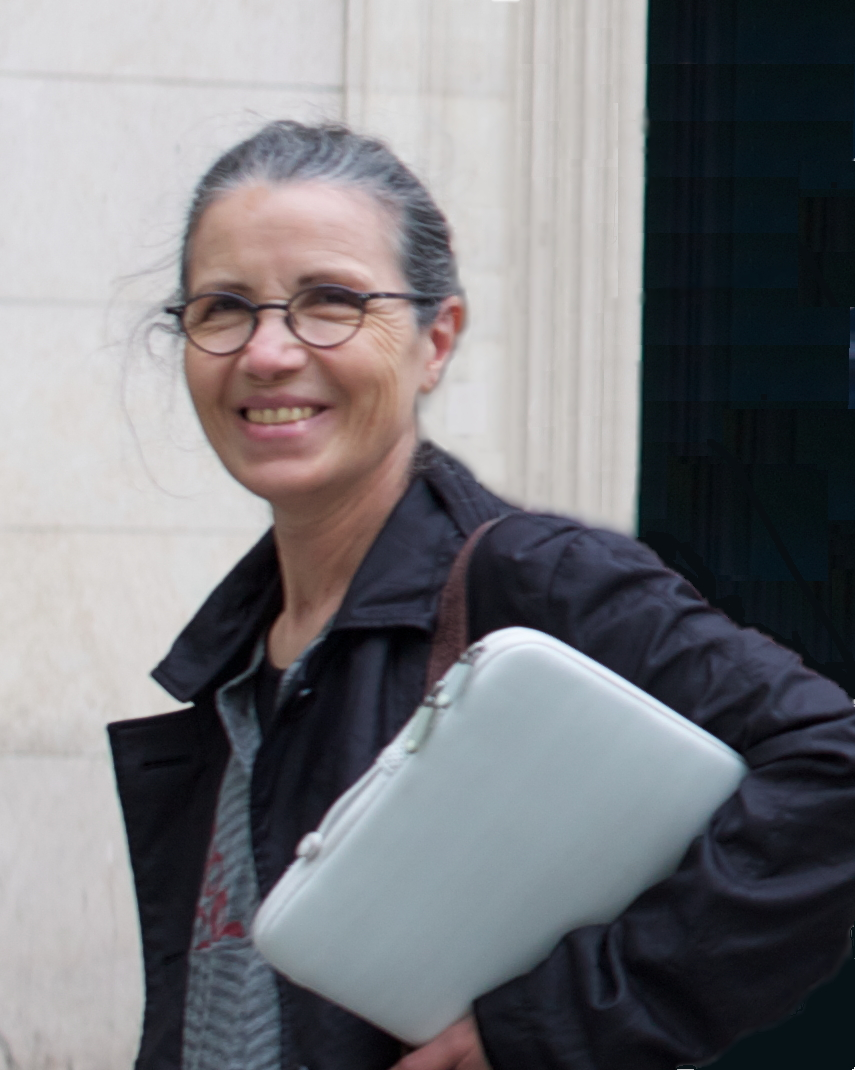
- Born: Radhia Rezig; 6 August 1947; Sakiet Sidi Youssef, French Tunisia
- Died: 1 May 2014 (aged 67); New York City, United States
- Citizenship: French
- Education: Institut National Polytechnique de Lorraine
- Known for: Abstract interpretation
- Spouse: Patrick Cousot
- Awards: ACM SIGPLAN Programming Languages Achievement Award; IEEE Computer Society Harlan D. Mills Award
- Scientific career
- Fields: Computer science
- Thesis: Fondements des méthodes de preuve d'invariance et de fatalité de programmes parallèles (1985)
- Doctoral advisor: Claude Pair

Radhia Cousot, née Rezig (French: [ʁadja kuzɔ]; 6 August 1947 – 1 May 2014) was a French computer scientist known for inventing abstract interpretation. Her 1985 doctoral thesis advanced the semantics, proof, and static analysis methods for concurrent and parallel programs.

== Biography ==
=== Early life and education ===
Radhia Cousot was born as Radhia Rezit on 6 August 1947, in Sakiet Sidi Youssef in the French protectorate of Tunisia. She survived the massacre of the children in her school on February 8, 1958. Raised in the rapidly evolving new post-colonial state of Tunisia, she developed a strong interest in mathematics and logic, and achieved a high academic performance at the lycée français d'Alger. She then studied at the l'École polytechnique d'Alger where she was both top of the class and the only woman on her course.

She specialised in mathematical optimization and integer linear programming. Supported by a UNESCO fellowship (1972–1975), she earned a master's degree in Computer Science (Diplôme d'études approfondies (DEA)) at the Joseph Fourier University of Grenoble in 1972. She obtained her Doctorate ès Sciences/State Doctorate in Mathematics in Nancy in 1985 under the supervision of Claude Pair with her dissertation entitled Fondements des méthodes de preuve d'invariance et de fatalité de programmes parallèles. (Note: In the 1980s, there existed in France two levels of PhDs, the higher one, the Doctorate ès Sciences/State Doctorate being necessary to access professorships. It has since been replaced by the habilitation.)

=== Career ===
Radhia Cousot was appointed Associate research scientist at the IMAG laboratory of the Joseph Fourier University of Grenoble (1975–1979). From 1980 she worked at the Centre national de la recherche scientifique, as junior research scientist, research scientist, senior research scientist, and senior research scientist emerita at the Computer Science laboratories of the Henri Poincaré University of Nancy (1980–1983). She worked at the University of Paris-Sud at Orsay from 1984 to 1988, then the École Polytechnique (1989–2008) where from 1991 she headed the research team "Semantics, Proof and Abstract interpretation" and the École Normale Supérieure (2006–2014).

Cousot supervised eight PhD students.

=== Death ===
Cousot died in New York from cancer on 1 May 2014.

== Research ==
Together with her husband Patrick, Radhia Cousot is the originator of abstract interpretation, an influential technique in formal methods. Abstract interpretation is based on three main ideas.

1. Any reasoning/proof/static analysis on a computer system refers to a semantics describing, at some level of abstraction, its possible executions.
2. The reasoning/proof/static analysis should abstract away all semantic properties irrelevant to the reasoning.
3. Because of undecidability, sound, fully automated, and always terminating reasonings on/proofs/static analysis of computer systems must perform mathematical inductions in the abstract and so, can only be approximate (even with finiteness and decidability hypothesis, because of combinatorial explosion beyond tiny systems).

In her thesis, Radhia Cousot advanced the semantics, proof, and static analysis methods for concurrent and parallel programs.

Radhia Cousot is at the origin of the contacts with Airbus in January 1999 that led to the development of Astrée run-time error analyzer from 2001 onwards, a tool for sound static program analysis of embedded control/command software developed at the École Normale Supérieure and now distributed by AbsInt GmbH, a German software company specialised on static analysis. Astrée is used in the transportation, space, and medical software industries.

== Awards and recognition ==
With Patrick Cousot, she received the ACM SIGPLAN Programming Languages Achievement Award in 2013 and the IEEE Computer Society Harlan D. Mills award in 2014 for "the invention of 'abstract interpretation', development of tool support, and its practical application".

In 2026, Cousot was announced as one of 72 historical women in STEM whose names have been proposed to be added to the 72 men already celebrated on the Eiffel Tower as part of the Hypatia Project. It was at one time agreed that strictly only French women should be included but Cousot was one of the names that the original proposer of the idea, Benjamin Rigaud, said should be included. The plan was announced by the Mayor of Paris, Anne Hidalgo following the recommendations of a committee led by Isabelle Vauglin of Femmes et Sciences and Jean-François Martins, representing the operating company which runs the Eiffel Tower.

== Radhia Cousot best young researcher paper award ==
Since September 2014, the Radhia Cousot best young researcher paper award is attributed annually by the program chair on behalf of the program committee of the Static Analysis Symposia (SAS).

- 2014 (Munich, Germany): Aleksandar Chakarov (University of Colorado, Boulder, CO, USA), Expectation invariants for probabilistic program loops as fixed points (with Sriram Sankaranarayanan), M. Müller-Olm & H. Seidl (Eds.): SAS 2014, LNCS 8723, pp. 85–100, Springer
- 2015 (Saint Malo, France): Marianna Rapoport (University of Waterloo, Ontario, Canada), Precise Data Flow Analysis in the Presence of Correlated Method Calls, (with Ondrej Lhoták and Frank Tip), S. Blazy & T. Jensen (Eds.): SAS 2015, LNCS 9291, pp. 54–71, Springer
- 2016 (Edinburgh, Scotland): Stefan Schulze Frielinghaus (Technical University of Munich, Germany), Enforcing Termination of Interprocedural Analysis, (with Helmut Seidl and Ralf Vogler), Xavier Rival (Ed.): SAS 2016, LNCS 9837, pp. 447–468, Springer
- 2017 (New York, NY, USA): Suvam Mukherjee (Indian Institute of Science, Bangalore, India) and Oded Padon (Tel Aviv University, Israel), Thread-Local Semantics and its Efficient Sequential Abstractions for Race-Free Programs, (with Sharon Shoham, Deepak D'Souza, and Noam Rinetzky), Francesco Ranzato (Ed.): SAS 2017, LNCS 10422, pp 253–276, Springer

== Publications ==
- Static Analysis by Abstract Interpretation of Embedded Critical Software
- Grammar semantics, analysis and parsing by abstract interpretation
- An Abstract Interpretation Framework for Termination
- A Semantic Integrated Development Environment
- An Abstract Interpretation Framework for Refactoring with Application to Extract Methods with Contracts
- Theories, Solvers and Static Analysis by Abstract Interpretation
- ANDROMEDA: accurate and scalable security analysis of web applications
- Automatic Inference of Necessary Preconditions
- A Galois Connection Calculus for Abstract Interpretation
- Static Analysis and Verification of Aerospace Software by Abstract Interpretation

Researchgate records 99 publications by Coursot
