= Baumstark =

Baumstark is a German surname. Notable people with the surname include:

- Anton Baumstark (1800–1876), German classical philologist
- Carl Anton Baumstark (1872–1948), German orientalist, philologist and liturgist
- Gertrude Baumstark (1941–2020), Romanian and German chess player
