= Wilhelm Rettich =

Wilhelm Rettich (Leipzig, 3 July 1892 - Sinzheim, 27 December 1988) was a German Jewish, later naturalized Dutch, composer and conductor.
