= Reinhard Wilhelm =

German computer scientist

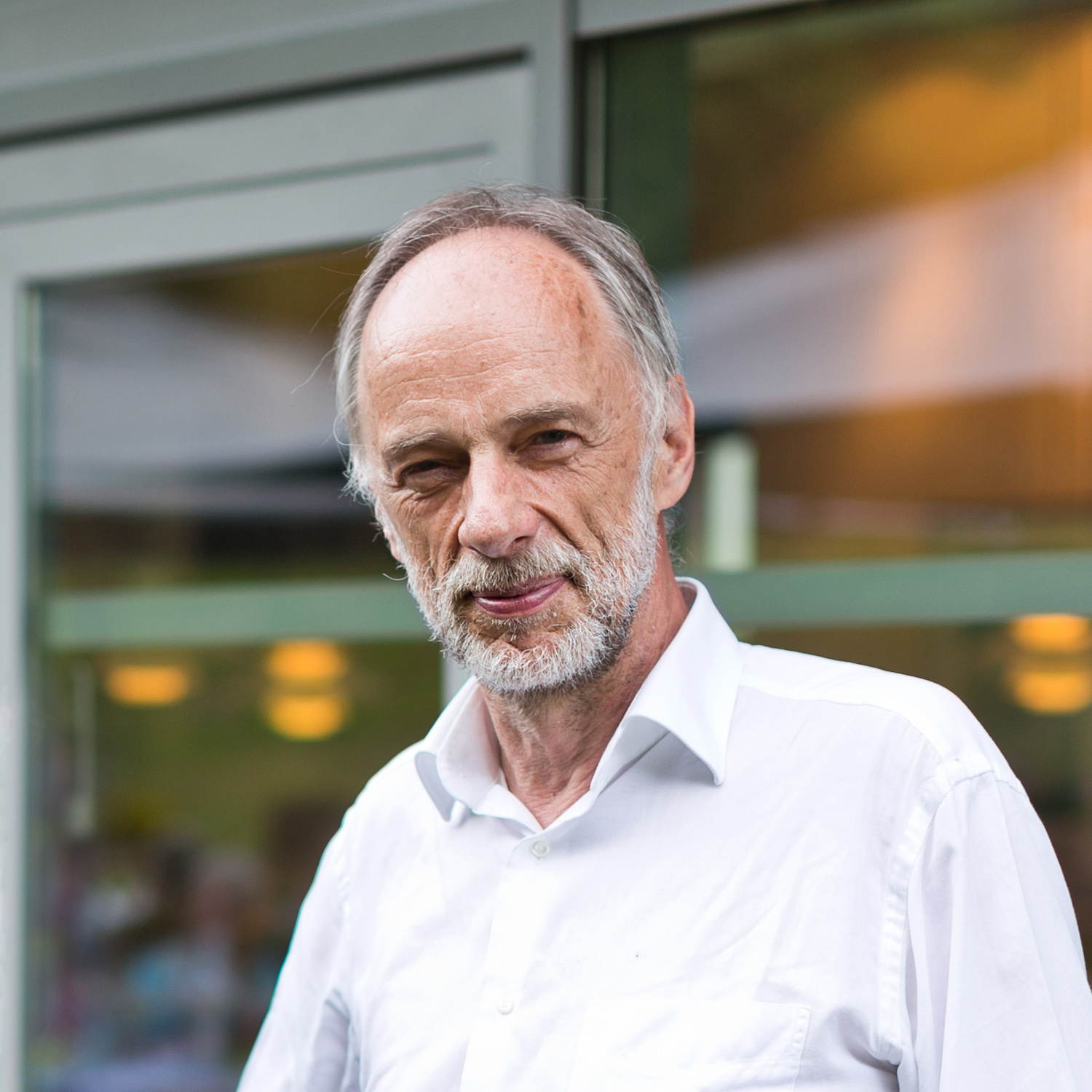
- Reinhard Wilhelm, 2014
- Born: 5 June 1946 (age 80); Finnentrop, Germany
- Education: University of Münster, Stanford University, Technical University of Munich
- Known for: compiler technology
- Awards: Konrad Zuse Medal (2009); Merit Cross on Ribbon (2010); ACM Distinguished Service Award (2011)
- Scientific career
- Fields: Computer Scientist
- Workplaces: Saarland University

Reinhard Wilhelm (born June 5, 1946) is a German computer scientist.

== Life and work ==
Wilhelm was born in Deutmecke, today part of the municipality of Finnentrop, Westphalia. He studied math, physics and mathematical logic at the University of Münster and computer science at the Technical University of Munich and Stanford University. He finished his PhD at the Technical University of Munich in 1977. In 1978, he obtained a professorship at Saarland University, where he led the chair for programming languages and compiler construction until his retirement in 2014. In addition, Wilhelm has held the post of scientific director of the Leibniz Center for Informatics at Schloss Dagstuhl from its inception in 1990 until 2014. Today he is a professor emeritus at Saarland University.

Wilhelm is one of the co-founders of the European Symposium on Programming (ESOP) and the European Joint Conferences on Theory and Practice of Software (ETAPS). The European Association for Programming Languages (EAPLS) goes back to his idea to found an organization for advancing research on programming languages and programming systems. In 1998, he founded AbsInt, a research spin-off that offers software-quality assurance tools based on abstract interpretation, among them tools for the verification of real-time requirements, used for example for certification of the time-critical embedded systems inside the Airbus A380.

Wilhelm's research focuses on programming languages, compiler construction, static program analysis and embedded real time systems, but also includes animation and visualization of algorithms and data structures. Wilhelm discovered connections between code selection and the theory of regular tree automata, which is relevant for code generation using tree automata. He is one of the co-developers of the MUG1, MUG2 and OPTRAN compiler generators, which are based on attribute grammars. Together with Ulrich Möncke, he proposed grammar flow analysis as a generalization of interprocedural data flow analysis. He invented a popular shape analysis based on three-valued logic together with Mooly Sagiv and Tom Reps.

Wilhelm is co-author of the book Compiler Construction, which teaches compilers not only for imperative languages, but for object-oriented, functional and logical ones as well and stresses theoretical foundation. It is available in German and French, too.

Wilhelm became a fellow of the ACM in 2000 for his research on compiler construction and program analysis and his work as a scientific director of the LZI. The TU Darmstadt and the Fraunhofer-Institut für Graphische Datenverarbeitung awarded him with the Alwin-Walther medal in 2006. In 2007 the French Ministry of Education and Research awarded him with the Gay-Lussac-Humboldt prize for his contributions to science and his achievements in German–French cooperation in research and education. He became a member of the European academy of sciences (Academia Europaea) in 2008. October of the same year he was awarded an honorary doctorate of the RWTH Aachen. In December, he obtained an honorary degree of Tartu University. In September 2009, he was awarded the Konrad Zuse Medal for his achievements in research and education with respect to compiler construction, real time analysis of programs and his service as scientific director of the LZI/Schloss Dagstuhl. In 2010 he was awarded the Cross of the Order of Merit of the Federal Republic of Germany and the ACM Distinguished Service Award. In 2013 he was accepted into the German National Academy Leopoldina. He received the Test-of-Time award at the international conference ESWEEK 2019 for the long term impact of his research on execution time bounds. In 2020, the IEEE Technical Committee on Real Time Systems awarded him their Outstanding Technical Achievement and Leadership Award. In 2021, he received the Test-of-Time Award of the IEEE Technical Committee on Real-Time Systems (TCRTS) for the article "The influence of processor architecture on the design and the results of WCET tools". He received the 2025 ACM SIGBED Technical Achievement Award "for his foundational and transformative work on worst-case execution time (WCET) analysis, timing predictability and static program analysis in embedded and cyber-physical systems".

== List of books ==
- Jacques Loeckx, Kurt Mehlhorn, Reinhard Wilhelm: Foundations of Programming Languages 1989
- Reinhard Wilhelm: Informatics - 10 Years Back. 10 Years Ahead. Springer 2001
- Reinhard Wilhelm, Helmut Seidl: Compiler Design: Virtual Machines, Springer 2011
- Helmut Seidl, Reinhard Wilhelm, Sebastian Hack: Compiler Design: Analysis and Transformation, Springer 2011
- Helmut Seidl, Reinhard Wilhelm, Sebastian Hack: Compiler Design: Syntactic and Semantic Analysis, Springer 2011
- Reinhard Wilhelm: Einsichten eines Informatikers von geringem Verstande – Glossen aus dem Informatik Spektrum. Springer Fachmedien, Wiesbaden 2020, ISBN 978-3-658-28385-8.
- Reinhard Wilhelm: Von Autopiloten, Taliban und dem Friedrichstadtpalast: Neue Einsichten eines Informatikers von geringem Verstande. Independently published 2022, ISBN 979-8820142680.

== Literature ==
- Thomas Reps, Mooly Sagiv, Jörg Bauer: An Appreciation of the Work of Reinhard Wilhelm. Program Analysis and Compilation, Theory and Practice (Springer, 2007), Lecture Notes in Computer Science Volume 4444.
