= Absint =

Absint may refer to:

- Absinthe, an alcoholic beverage
- AbsInt GmbH, a German software company
