= Blazy =

Blazy is a surname. Notable people with the name include:

- Kent Blazy, American country music songwriter
- Matthieu Blazy (born 1984), French-Belgian designer
- Sandrine Blazy, French computer scientist
- Philippe Douste-Blazy (born 1953), French politician
