= Hermann Hagedorn (poet) =

Hermann Hagedorn (20 August 1884 in Essen-Gerschede – 7 March 1951 near Fretter, Finnentrop,) was a German writer, lyric poet and teacher. He is the best known representative of Borbecksch, a German dialect.

== Important works ==
- Hatte on Heeme. Plattdeutsche Dichtungen. 1930.
- Honnenseelen. Geschichten von onse verbeenige Frönne. In niedersächsischer Mundart. 1938.
- Kriegstagebauk. In niedersächsischer Mundart. 1940.
- Hämann Ohme Joann. Stemmen uut Blaut on Äre. In niedersächsischer Mundart. 1941.
- Ulenspeigel en Essen. 1941.
- Märchenzauber. Twölf Märchen opp platt. 1951.
- Fläutepiepen. 1956.
- Dat Dubbelte-Dutzend-Bauk. 12 Geschichten, 12 Gedichte. 1959.
