= Kilian Kirchhoff =

- Born: 18 December 1892; Rönkhausen, Germany
- Died: 24 April 1944 (aged 51); Brandenburg-Görden Prison
- Occupation: Priest
- Parent(s): Heinrich and Maria Kirchhoff

Padre Kilian Kirchhoff OFM (given name: Josef Kirchhoff; born 18 December 1892 in Rönkhausen; executed 24 April 1944 in Brandenburg-Görden Prison) was a Catholic priest, translator and dissident. He was executed by the Third Reich for critical remarks. Austrian-British composer Egon Wellesz said that he "off was the only modern scholar who devoted his life to the evocation of the spirit of Eastern Christianity by translating into German prose the entire treasury of Byzantine hymns of the Office."

Kirchhoff was arrested by the Gestapo on October 21, 1943, for expressions critical of the regime. In the subsequent trial, the witness justified the denunciation with her hatred of priests, "because they were opponents of National Socialism". Roland Freisler sentenced Kirchhoff to death on March 7, 1944, at the People's Court in Berlin. Kirchhoff himself submitted written requests for clemency, set up and promoted by Carl Anton Baumstark, along with a group of theologians and orientalists from various universities. After the war, the intercession of the Apostolic Nuncio Cesare Orsenigo, the head of the Episcopal Commissariat of the Fulda Bishops' Conference in Berlin, Heinrich Wienken, and the Paderborn Bishop Lorenz Jaeger can be heard. Nonetheless, Kirchhoff's death sentence was carried out on April 24, 1944 in Brandenburg-Görden by beheading. The urn with Kirchhoff's ashes was buried on April 1, 1950 in the crypt of the Werl Franciscan monastery at Werl park cemetery.

== Publications ==
- Licht vom Licht: Hymnen / Symeon der Neue Theologe
- Die Ostkirche betet
- Der Osterjubel der Ostkirche
- Hymnen der Ostkirche
