= Finnentrop =

- Town
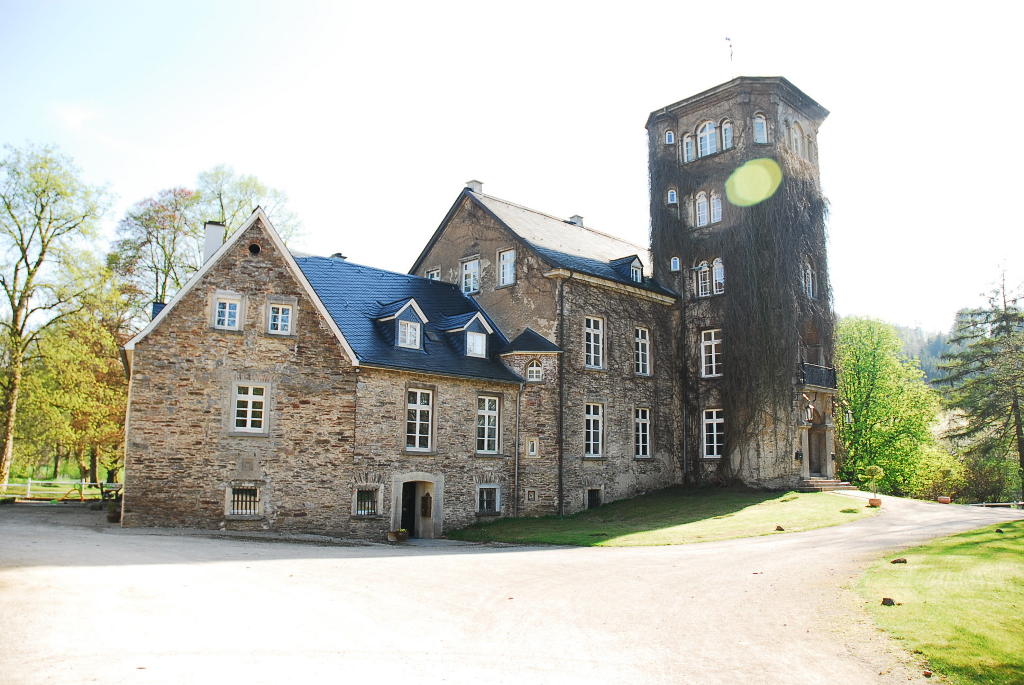
- Bamenohl castle

- Coat of arms

- Location of Finnentrop within Olpe district
- Interactive map of Finnentrop
- Location within Germany Location within North Rhine-Westphalia
- Coordinates: 51°10′N 07°58′E
- Country: Germany
- State: North Rhine-Westphalia
- Admin. region: Arnsberg
- District: Olpe
- Subdivisions: 40

Government
  - Mayor (2020–25): Achim Henkel (CDU)

Area
  - Total: 104.42 km^{2} (40.32 sq mi)
- Elevation: 220–651 m (722–2,136 ft)

Population (2025-12-31)
  - Total: 16,729
  - Density: 160.21/km^{2} (414.94/sq mi)
- Time zone: UTC+01:00 (CET)
  - Summer (DST): UTC+02:00 (CEST)
- Postal codes: 57413
- Dialling codes: 02721, 02395, 02724
- Vehicle registration: OE
- Website: www.finnentrop.de

Finnentrop (German pronunciation: [ˈfɪnəntʁɔp]) is a municipality in Olpe district in North Rhine-Westphalia, Germany.

== Geography ==
Finnentrop is situated in the Sauerland, near the forks of the rivers Bigge and Lenne. Finnentrop shares borders with Sundern and Eslohe (both part of Hochsauerland district), Lennestadt and Attendorn (both in Olpe district), as well as with Plettenberg (Märkischer Kreis district). Finnentrop is divided into the following constituent municipalities:

Ahausen with Ahauser Mühle, Dahm Altfinnentrop Bamenohl Bausenrode Deutmecke Elsmecke Faulebutter Fehrenbracht with Fretterspring Finnentrop Fretter with Delf, Giebelscheid Frettermühle with Mißmecke	Frielentrop Gierschlade with Schwartmecke Glinge Heggen Hollenbock Hülschotten with Tiefenau Illeschlade Lenhausen Müllen Ostentrop Permecke	Ramscheid Rönkhausen Sange Schliprüthen with Schliprüthener Mühle, Becksiepen, Kuckuck, Steinsiepen Schöndelt Schönholthausen with Besten Serkenrode Weringhausen Weuspert with Klingelborn Wiebelhausen Wörden

== History ==
While the municipality of Finnentrop didn't come into being before 1 July 1969, the history of the constituting villages dates back from the Middle Ages. In 1162 Lenhausen and Rönkhausen were mentioned for the first time. Until 13 July 1908, the place now known as Finnentrop had three names: Habbecke, Neubrücke (“Newbridge”) and, once the Ruhr-Sieg railway was built, Bahnhof Finnentrop (“Finnentrop Railway Station”). Neubrücke consisted of only one building at the forks of Bigge and Lenne (Reuters Haus, first mentioned in 1847). The “new bridge” seems to have already been built by 1847, as the “Reuter” had to charge tolls.

The new municipality was cobbled together in 1969 from parts of the old Amt of Serkenrode (Meschede district), the municipalities of Schliprüthen and Oedingen and parts of Attendorn-Land and Helden. This restructuring also saw the municipality pass from Meschede district (which was abolished in 1974) to Olpe district. The municipality's name is drawn from the original centre of Finnentrop situated a few hundred metres up the Bigge river, now known as Altfinnentrop (“alt” is German for “old”). The ending —trop comes from trop or torp, meaning “village”. The High German word Dorf is a cognate, as is the English word thorpe.

The municipal arms shows a rose under a wavy chevron. The rose stands for the Lords of Finnentrop (von Vinnentrop) and dates back to the year 1358. The chevron stands for the two rivers, the Bigge and the Lenne, which merge in the municipality. The colour green refers to the great swathes of greenery in the municipal area.

Finnentrop maintains partnership arrangements with:

- Diksmuide, Belgium (since 1979);
- (Germany) Helbra, Saxony-Anhalt (since 1990).

== Population ==
Historical population

Year	Pop.	±% p.a.
1965	16,200	—
1970	16,019	−0.22%
1975	16,369	+0.43%
1980	16,188	−0.22%
1985	16,141	−0.06%
1990	17,253	+1.34%
1995	18,299	+1.18%

Year	Pop.	±% p.a.
2000	18,559	+0.28%
2005	18,400	−0.17%
2010	17,551	−0.94%
2015	17,258	−0.34%
2020	16,854	−0.47%
2025	16,729	−0.15%

Source: Landesdatabank Nordrhein-Westfalen

== Mayors ==
The mayor between 1997 and 2020 was the jurist Dietmar Heß (* 1955) (CDU). In September 2020 Achim Henkel (CDU) has been elected. The 53 year old first chief police officer used to be in charge of the policestation in Olpe for many years.

== Culture and sightseeing ==
=== Theatres & Museums ===
- Schützenhof Lichtspiele, 1954-vintage movie theater renovated in 2006 with 170 seats
- Heimatstube Schönholthausen (museum)

=== Buildings ===
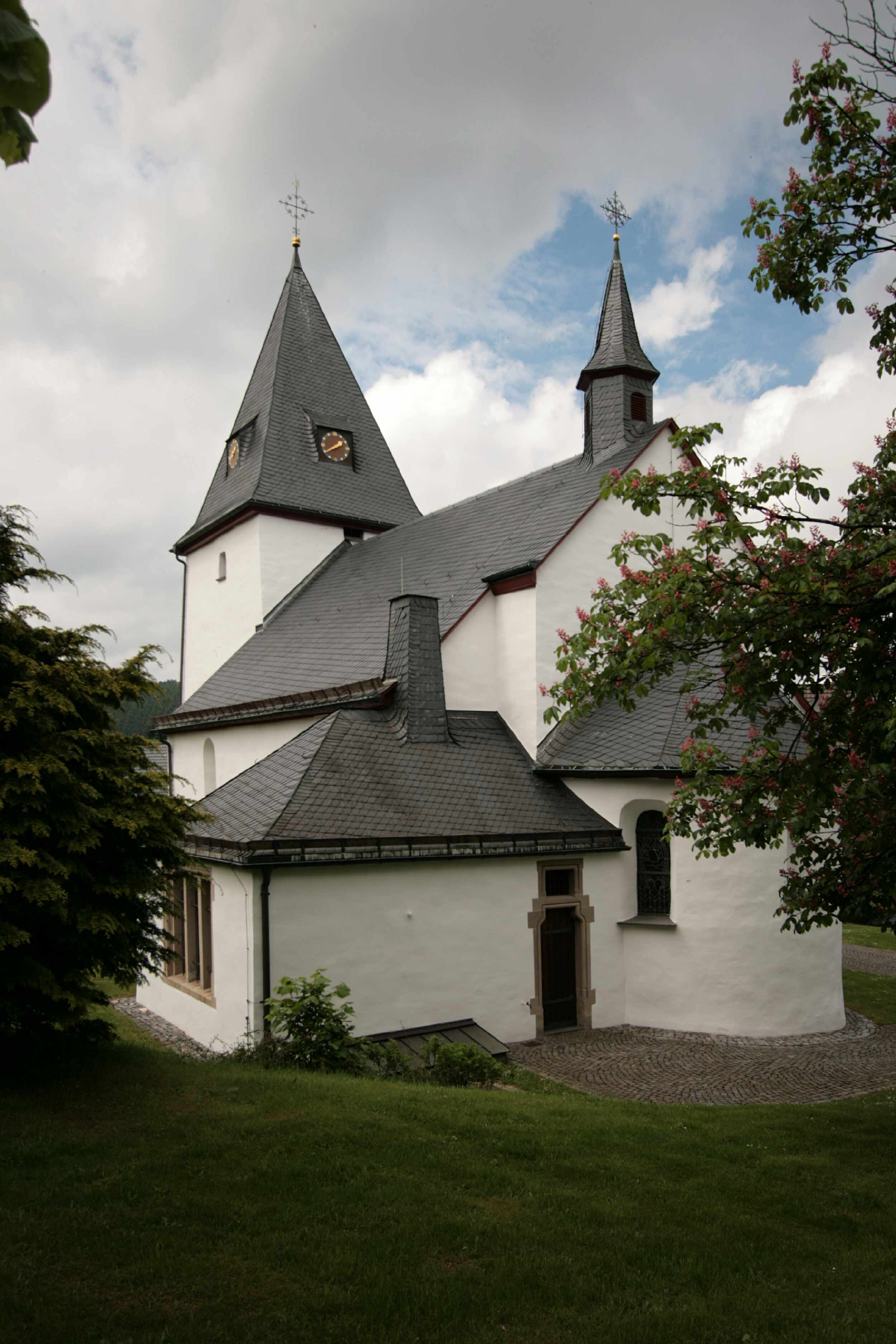
St. Georg in Schliprüthen

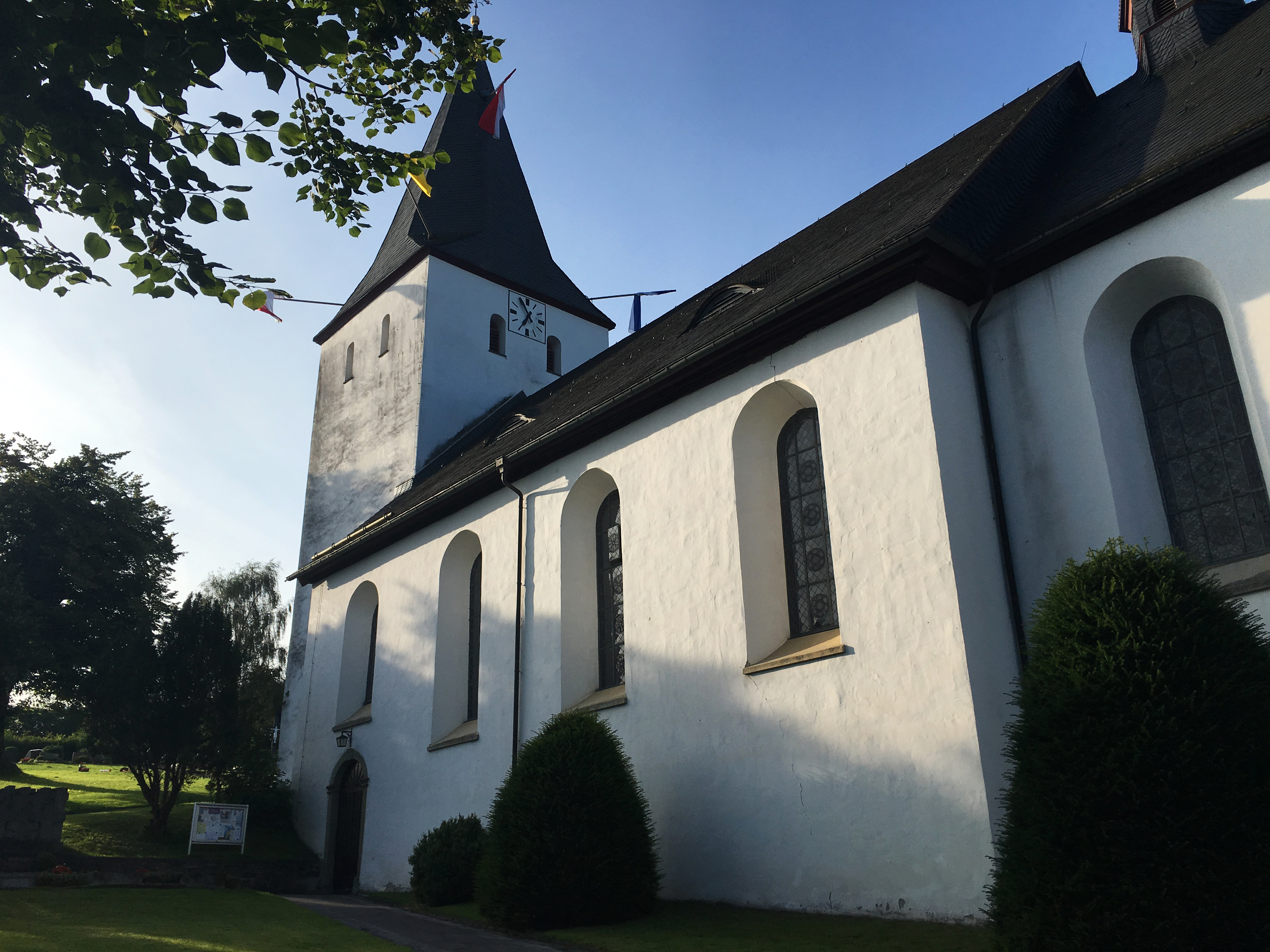
Mariä Himmelfahrt in Schönholthausen

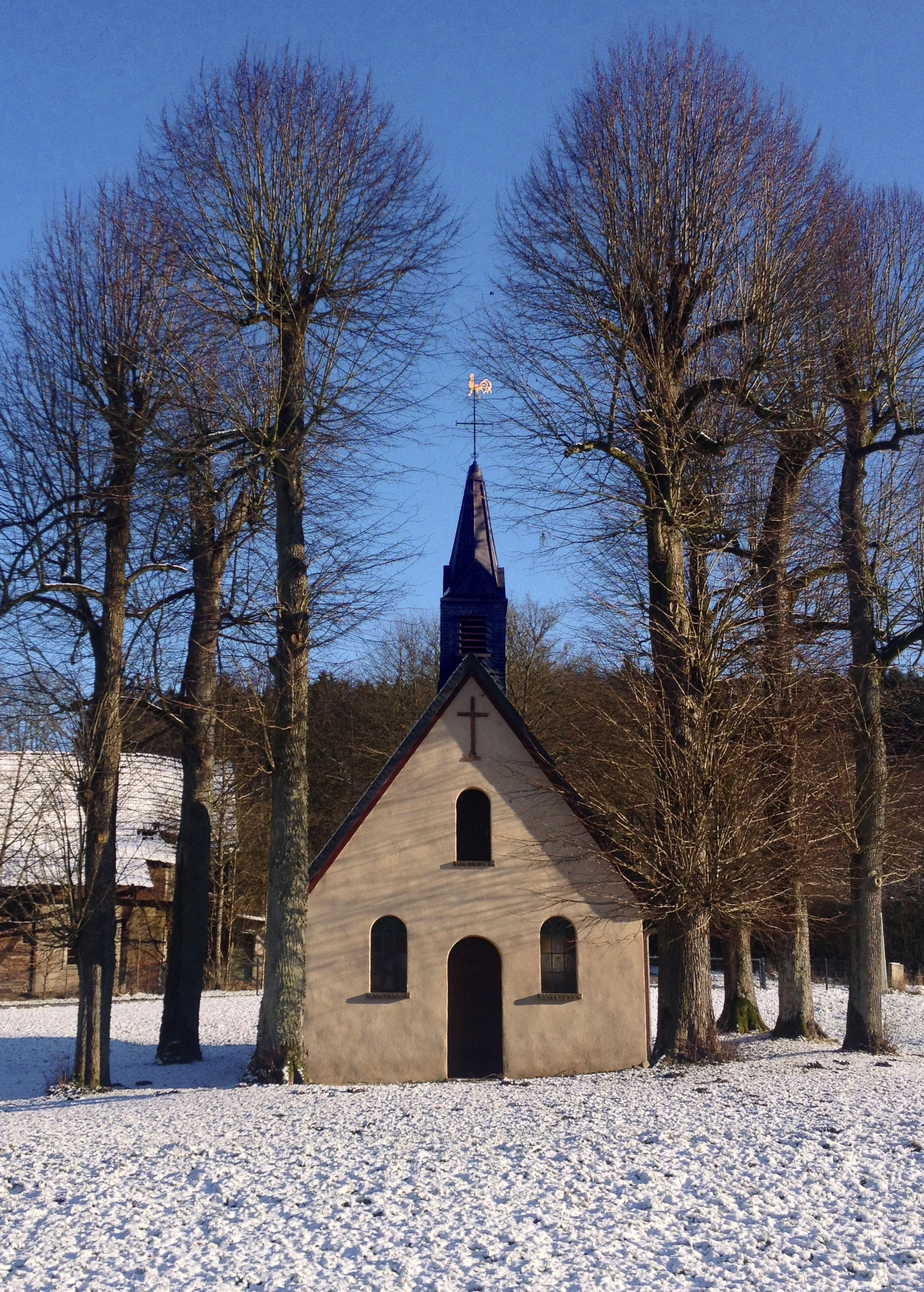
Matthiaskapelle in Altfinnentrop

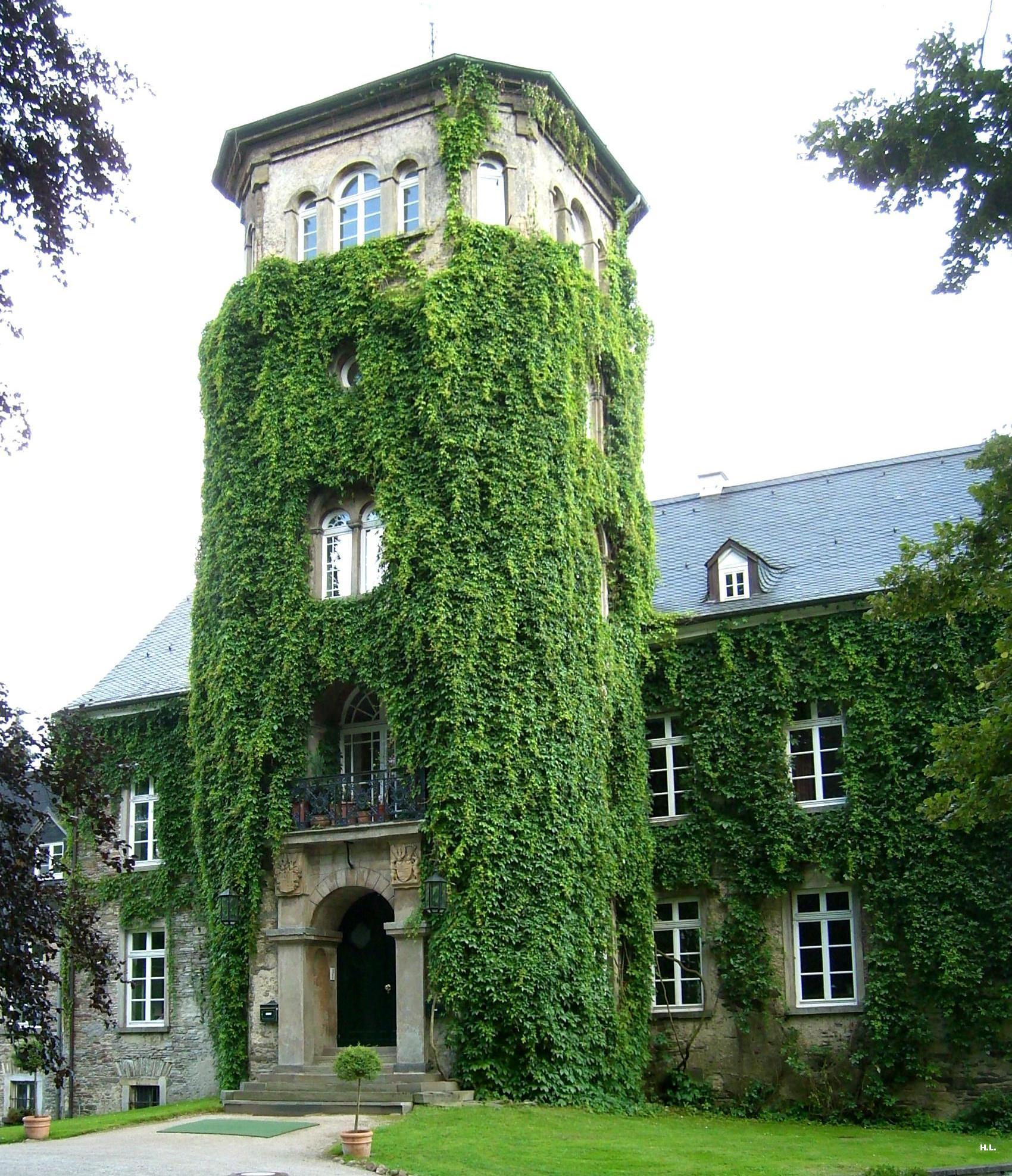
Haus Bamenohl

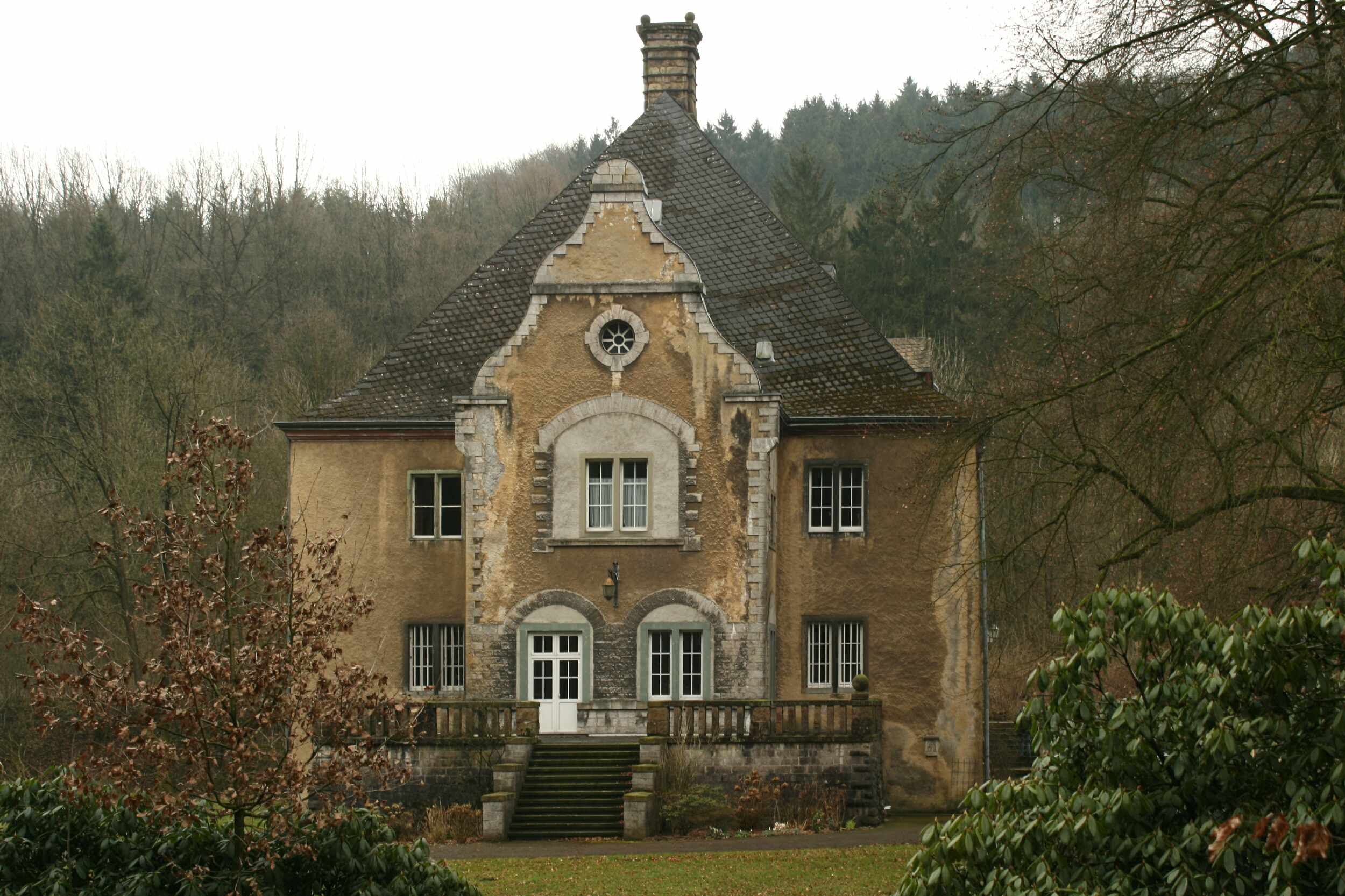
Schloss Ahausen

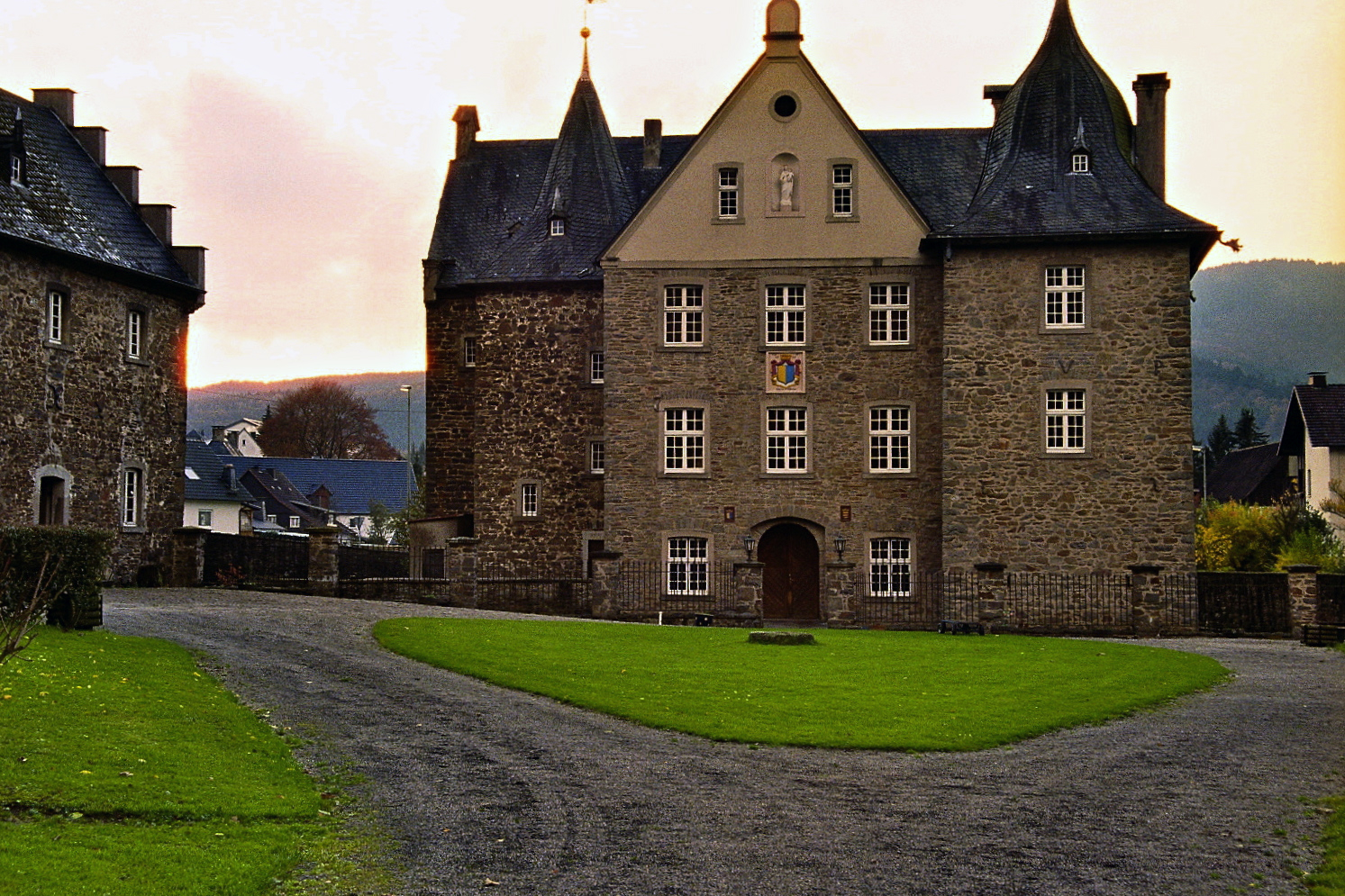
Schloss Lenhausen
- St. Georg hall church in (Schliprüthen), dating from before the 12th century
- Romanesque Catholic parish church Mariä Himmelfahrt in Schönholthausen, dating in parts from the 13th century
- Matthiaskapelle chapel in Altfinnentrop from 1383
- Haus Bamenohl castle in Bamenohl (14th century)
- Schloss Ahausen castle close to Heggen
- Schloss Lenhausen castle in Lenhausen (13th century)
- Reiterstellwerk (historic signal box)

=== Regular events ===
- Schützenfest (marksmen's festival) in the larger villages
- Prunksitzung by the Lenhausen Carnival Club (LCC) (revue, Saturday before Altweibertag – Old Women's Day)
- Prunksitzung by the Festkommitee Finnentroper Karneval (revue)
- Waldfest “Im Schee” Finnentrop (“forest festival”, weekend before Whitsun)
- Spritzenfest of the fire station Bamenohl (second weekend in August)
- Open-air concert at Haus Bamenohl (third weekend in August)
- Bürgerfrühschoppen of the fire brigade on German Unity Day
- Christmas market at the town hall (second weekend in Advent)

== Economy and infrastructure ==
Among the nationally known companies in Finnentrop are Eibach (automotive springs), Metten Fleischwaren (meat processing) and a plant of ThyssenKrupp Steel Europe AG.

=== Transport ===
Finnentrop station is situated at the Ruhr–Sieg railway, from where the Bigge Valley Railway (RB92) of Hessische Landesbahn, section DreiLänderBahn connects to Olpe. The Attendorn-Finnentrop aerodrome (ICAO: EDKU) is situated close to the village of Heggen. Finnentrop is located in the area of the fare association Westfalen-Tarif.

=== Public institutions ===
- Rathaus Finnentrop (town hall)
- Erlebnisbad Finto (natatorium)
- Jugendherberge Bamenohl (Germany's first private youth hostel after the Second World War)
- Jugendherberge Heggen (hostel
- Finnentrop volunteer fire brigade with eleven fire stations

=== Education ===
There are six primary schools, one Hauptschule, one Realschule and one Gesamtschule.

== Notable people ==
=== Honorary citizens ===
- Erwin Oberkalkofen, former mayor
- Ernst Vollmer, former municipality director

=== Sons and daughters of the municipality ===
- Gertrud von Plettenberg († 1608), Mistress of Ernest of Bavaria, Prince-elector-archbishop of the Archbishopric of Cologne
- Friedrich Georg Pape (1763−1816), one of the first German democrats
- Johann Joseph Freidhoff (1768−1818), engraver
- Alexander Haindorf (1784–1862), doctor, Jewish reformer, psychologist, university lecturer
- Eduard Bartling (1845−1927), entrepreneur and politician
- Lawrence Becker (1869–1947), lawyer and judge who served as Solicitor of the United States Treasury
- Henry M. Arens (1873−1963), original name Heinrich Martin Arens, politician who served in many offices in Minnesota, including the U.S. House of Representatives
- Josef Baumhoff (1887−1962), German official, newspaper publisher and politician
- Kilian Kirchhoff (1892–1944), priest, translator and dissident
- Erich Feldmann (1929−1998), Priester, Kirchenhistoriker und Augustinusforscher
- Klaus-Dieter Uelhoff (born 1936), politician, member of the Bundestag
- Reinhard Wilhelm (born 1946), scientist
- Paul Scheermann (born 1949), soccer player
- Hilde Mattheis (born 1954), politician, member of the Bundestag
- Hubertus Kramer (1959–2022), politician
- Michael Opitz (1962–2026), footballer

=== Notable people who have worked in the municipality ===
- John A. Roebling (1806−1869), original name Johann August Röbling, civil engineer, designer of the Brooklyn Bridge
- Johannes Dornseiffer (1837−1914), priest, co-founder of many savings and loan companies connected with Friedrich Wilhelm Raiffeisen
- Hermann Hagedorn, (1884–1951), German writer, lyric poet and teacher
- Angela Maria Autsch (1900−1944), nun of the Trinitarian Order, was murdered in the Auschwitz concentration camp

=== Artists ===
- Andreas Schmidt, film actor and theatre director based out of Kreuzberg, Berlin
