= Alexander Haindorf =

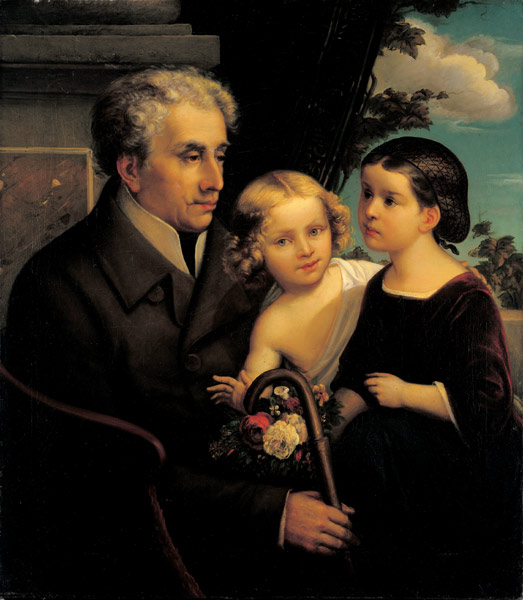
Haindorf and his grandchildren, painted by Caspar Göke in 1854

Alexander Haindorf (2 May 1784 – 16 October 1862) was a Jewish reformer, psychologist, university lecturer, writer, journalist and art collector. He was a promoter of emancipation of 19th century liberal Judaism and wrote one of the first psychiatric textbooks of German origin. Often in his life he got caught up in the discord between religious affiliation and the strive for social and scientific recognition. He tried to counteract his inner-Jewish conflict with education and promoting emancipation among Jewish communities. This caused him to develop into a both cultural-historical and scientific-historical important persona.

== Childhood ==
Alexander was born in 1784 in the German town Lenhausen near Finnentrop. His original birthname was Alexander Hirsch. He was the son of Jewish parents consisting of his father Sendel Hertz who was a salesman and his second wife Vogel Sophie Seligmann. After the early death of his parents, he lived with his grandparents in Hamm. Who, despite his young age, had him engage in peddling.

He studied Hebrew with a Polish Talmudist and secretly read German books. Because of his parents he was originally studying Talmud to become a Rabbi. Haindorf later learned the profession of Schächter (kosher butcher) in Kamen. At 20, however, he went back to school. He successfully visited the Gymnasium, the secondary school in Germany. Based on the laws in Germany not every Jewish child could get such an education. Haindorf was able to visit the school because of his intellect and because the head of the Jewish community, Amschel Herz, in Hamm (1730-1809), a renowned art collector, took care of the gifted young man and promoted his artistic sense as well as his scholarly interests. Herz took Haindorf like a foster child (although not officially) and financed his education. In 1809 the last name Haindorf was chosen when all Jewish citizens of Hessen-Darmstadt were forced to use a hereditary surname.

== Education and career ==
Haindorf studied philosophy, history, literature, medicine and psychology in Würzburg, Erlangen, Bamberg and Heidelberg. During his time in Würzburg, Haindorf was taught by the German mathematical philosopher Jakob Wagner whom he met again when doing his doctorate 1810 in Heidelberg. He started teaching the subject mental health in Heidelberg. In 1811 Haindorf published his postdoctoral thesis "Versuch einer Pathologie und Therapie der Geistes- und Gemüthskrankheiten" (English: Attempt at a pathology and therapy of mental and emotional illnesses). His thesis was well received and one of the reasons his request to become a private lecturer was accepted. Because of Haindorfs first publication, he gained a reputation as a specialist in mental and emotional illnesses. Starting in summer 1811 Haindorf announced a course called "Psychologie und Anthropologie in vorzüglicher Rücksicht auf Gemüts- und Geisteskrankheiten und die Zurechnung der Verbrechen, von denen sie Ursache sein können". For three semesters Haindorf continued holding lectures about pathology, therapy and psychology. In July 1812 Haindorf handed in a request to carry the title of professor, which was denied. In his request Alexander Haindorf listed positive reactions to his book as an argument to make him a professor. In his rejection letter a number of formal reasons, for example, that he has only been teaching for a year, for his rejection were listed; however, the main point was him being a Jew. Although his reaction is not directly documented, his rejection is seen as one of the causes Haindorf was passionate about Jew rights and equality. Based on the value of his book and his teaching experience he should have been a professor, but the time was not ready for a Jew in an equal position to other scholars. Haindorf was angered and requested a two years long holiday to expand his education by visiting the most excellent medical institutions in France, Italy and Germany. However, he later stated that bad rumours were going around and that he was not planning on coming back. He moved to Paris from 1813 until 1814 to further study psychiatry at a mental health facility. His experience in France resulted in his second book's publication in 1815. Back in Germany, Haindorf became a practical doctor while continuing to teach. Over the course of his life, he continued to teach performing surgeries, obstetrics and psychiatry at the University of Münster. He became the first Jewish private lecturer at the University of Münster. He also continued teaching psychology and became known for his teaching and support for a Jewish school in Münster. In 1825 he founded the "Verein zur Beförderung von Handwerken Unter den Juden" (English: Association for the promotion of craftwork among Jews), whose influence of this society extended within ten years over Westphalia and Rhenish Prussia.

== Family ==
In 1815 Haindorf was married to his wife Sophie, after a five-year-long engagement. She was the daughter of the wealthy Elias Masks (1765-1854). His wife died one year into the marriage after the birth of their only daughter. The daughter, who was also called Sophie, was raised by the house lady Gaublitz. She was a childhood friend of her mom and was invited into the household after meeting Haindorf in Paris. She was a Christian and influenced his child with her faith. Sophie had many children: Richard (1843-1906), Otto (1844-1923), Helene (1845-1869), Ernst (1847-1902), Henriette (1848-?), Agnes (1851-1926) and Robert Loeb (1853-1925). Her father Haindorf as well as Elias Marks tried to convince her to not baptize her children to become Protestants. Her husband and Sophie discussed the matter over the cause of years, worrying not only about her father but also about the freedom of decision for their children. In 1862, after Haindorf's death, her children were baptized. This effect was not attended by her father and caused fights between the two. Sophie was influenced by Gaublitz and remained in contact with her in her adulthood but also inherited many traits of her father. She was influenced by her father when it comes to good education and good peer groups. She also adopted his sense of art which eventually would lead to her inheriting his art collection after his death.

Haindorf stopped his activity as a doctor, however, not his leading positions in the association shortly after his father-in-law died in 1854. He went back to Hamm to be near his daughter Sophie and his son-in-law Jakob Loeb in 1854 where he stayed until his death in 1862. He moved into his father-in-law's (Elias Marks) house, located in Südstraße 6 in Hamm. 46 years after his death he was buried beside his wife in Münster.

== Jewish emancipation ==
Haindorf was part of what is referred to as the first emancipated generation. He was an advocate of Jewish emancipation and one of the earliest representatives of liberal Judaism. The most important goal for him was the reformation of the Jewish school system in Westphalia. Schooling for Jews should, according to him, be improved not by the utilization of Christian schools but an establishment of their own educational institutions. He feared that Christian religious teachers might destroy previous learning experiences with wrong views and egoistic motives. His childhood as well as his personal experiences influenced both his attitude toward Judaism as well as pedagogy and education.

=== Marks-Haindorf Foundation ===
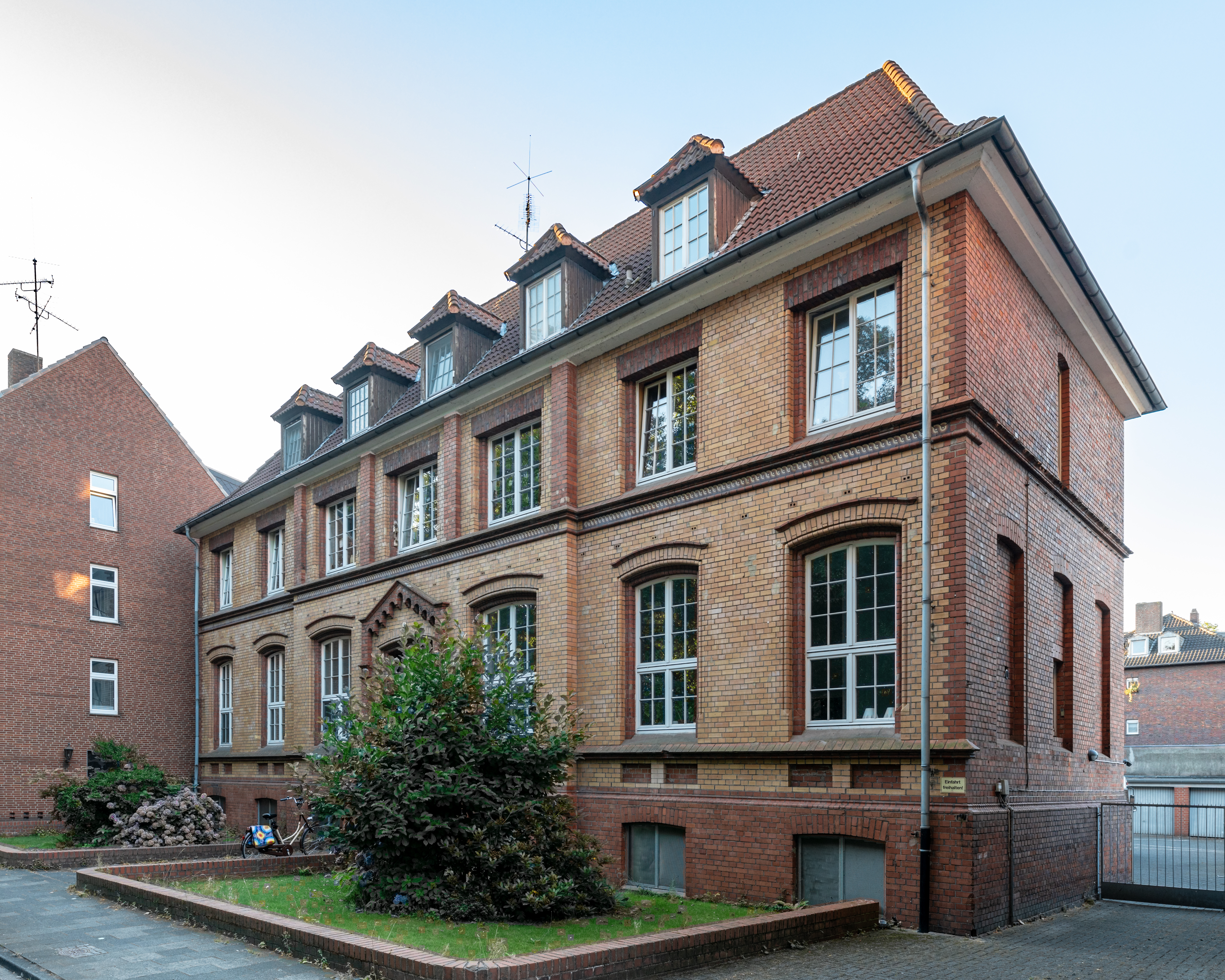
Former building of the Marks-Haindorf foundation in Münster

On 28 November 1825 Haindorf founded the "Verein zur Beförderung von Handwerken unter den Juden und zur Begründung einer Schulanstalt, worin arme und verwaiste Kinder unterrichtet und künftige jüdische Schullehrer gebildet werden sollen“. He tried to counteract the alleged deficit of Jewish compared to Christian culture by professionalising the Jewish school system and proving capability for emancipation in Jews. Jewish and Christian people were supposed to equal and this goal was best achievable through education. These pedagogic goals were characterised by optimism of enlightenment, prejudice free humanity and tolerance. He was hoping the participation of the Jewish on European culture would end the isolation of the Jewish community. Training qualified Jewish elementary school teachers were supposed to support the multiplication of the reformation of the Jewish school system. This training as well as the education was conducted in German. Subjects included history, rhetoric, German and foreign languages including French and Latin. The first priority of the foundation, however, was one elementary school as well as a teachers' seminar with new pedagogic content. In contrary to these new Jewish institutions, Christian schools in the region were badly equipped and overcrowded. This fact in combination with the positive reputation of his association growing between 1830 and 1840, caused even Christian parents to be willing to send their children there. Over the course of the nineteenth century several hundred teachers and assistance graduated there. In 1828 the school was obtaining characteristics of a Jewish-Christian community school. Only religious class was conducted separately to prevent prejustes and conflict.

== Collections ==
Collecting art and antiques was one of Haindorf's greatest passions. From 1816 to his death, Haindorf's collections grew to about 400 German and Dutch artworks. He also owned a collection of Christian art. For example, fragments of the altar of Lieborn. He was a board member of the "Kunstverein für die Rheinlande and Westfalen" (Art association for Rhineland Westphalia), which was founded in 1829 and continued after his death. This is often described as an example of his acceptance by the Christian-dominated society in the 19th century. Jews were usually not accepted into non-Jewish organisations, clubs or any form of association. He was also part of countless other associations in Münster and Westphalia. His collection was left to his daughter Sophie when he died in 1862. The collection was stored at Gut Caldenhof at this time and still contained all of the 400 artworks.

== Publications ==
- Versuch einer Pathologie und Therapie der Gemüths- und Geisteskrankheiten. Heidelberg: Braun 1811
- Beiträge zur Culturgeschichte der Medizin und Chirurgie Frankreichs, [...]. Göttingen 1815 [Rez.: Jenaer Allg. Literatur-Ztg. 1816, Nr.44]
- Geschichte der Deutschen. Ein historisches Lesebuch für Frauen und Mädchen aus den gebildeten Ständen. Von einer Erzieherin. Hamm 1825
- Jahresberichte des Vereins für Westphalen und Rheinprovinz zur Bildung von Elementarlehrern und Beförderung von Handwerken und Künsten unter den Juden 1826-1830
- Geschichte von Spanien und Portugall. Ein historisches Lesebuch von derselben Erzieherin. Hamm 1830
- Geschichte von Italien. Historisches Lesebuch für gebildete Leser und Leserinnen. Münster 1834
