= Borbecksch Platt dialect =

Low German dialect

Borbecksch
- Native to: Germany
- Region: Essen, Oberhausen, Bottrop (Ruhr Area)
- Language family: Indo-European: Germanic; West Germanic; North Sea Germanic; Low German; Low Saxon; Westphalian; South Westphalian; Borbecksch

Language codes
- ISO 639-3: –
- Glottolog: None

Borbecksch Platt (also called Borbecksch or Borbecker Platt) is a Low German dialect spoken in Essen, Oberhausen and Bottrop, Ruhr Area, North Rhine-Westphalia, Germany.

Borbecksch is one of the variants of the South Westphalian dialects (German Südwestfälisch), which belong to Westphalian (Westfälisch), itself a variant of Low German (Plattdeutsch). Neighboring dialects are Essensch (in the city of Essen), Waddisch (in Werden) and Mölmsch (in Mülheim).

In fact, the true dialect of Borbecksch is not used anymore except for older people. Today efforts are made by some groups/associations to protect Borbecksch.

The best known representative of Borbecksch is Hermann Hagedorn.

== Lord's Prayer ==
English Our Father in heaven, Hallowed be your name, Your kingdom come, Your will be done, On earth as in heaven. Give us today our daily bread. Forgive us our sins As we forgive those Who sin against us. Save us from the time of trial And deliver us from evil. For the kingdom, the power, And the glory are yours. Now and for ever. Amen.	Borbecksch Onse Vader em Hemmel Din Name sall gehillig wären, Din Riek sall kommen, Din Wille sall passeeren as em Hemmel so ok op Ären Onse däglich Brot gäw ons vandage On vegäw ons onse Schuld As ok wi dä vergäwt, Dä en onse Schuld stott. On föhr ons nech en Väseukung Sönnern befrie ons van däm Uewel. Denn din es dat Riek, on dä Kraff On dä Herrlichkeit, en Ewigkeit. Amen.	Dutch Onze vader die in de hemel zijt Uw naam worde geheiligd. Uw rijk kome. Uw wil geschiede Op aarde zoals in de hemel. Geef ons heden ons dagelijks brood. En vergeef ons onze schuld, Zoals wij ook aan anderen Hun schuld vergeven. En leid ons niet in bekoring, Maar verlos ons van het kwade. Want U is het koninkrijk en de kracht En de heerlijkheid in eeuwigheid Amen.	Standard German Vater unser im Himmel, Geheiligt werde dein Name. Dein Reich komme. Dein Wille geschehe, Wie im Himmel so auf Erden. Unser tägliches Brot gib uns heute. Und vergib uns unsere Schuld, Wie auch wir vergeben Unseren Schuldigern. Und führe uns nicht in Versuchung, Sondern erlöse uns von dem Bösen. Denn dein ist das Reich und die Kraft Und die Herrlichkeit in Ewigkeit. Amen.

== Other examples ==
Borbecksch	Dutch	English	German	Frisian
maken	maken	make	machen	meitsje
Dag(g)	dag	day	Tag	dei
etten	eten	eat	essen	ite
ti´en	tien	ten	zehn	tsien

== Literature ==
- Hermann Hagedorn
- Elisabeth Holte
- Johannes Pesch
- Willi Schlüter
- Hermann Witte
- Josef Witte
- Willi Witte

== See also ==
- Dutch
- Ruhr Language ("Ruhrdeutsch")
