= Versuch einer Pathologie und Therapie der Geistes- und Gemüthskrankheiten =

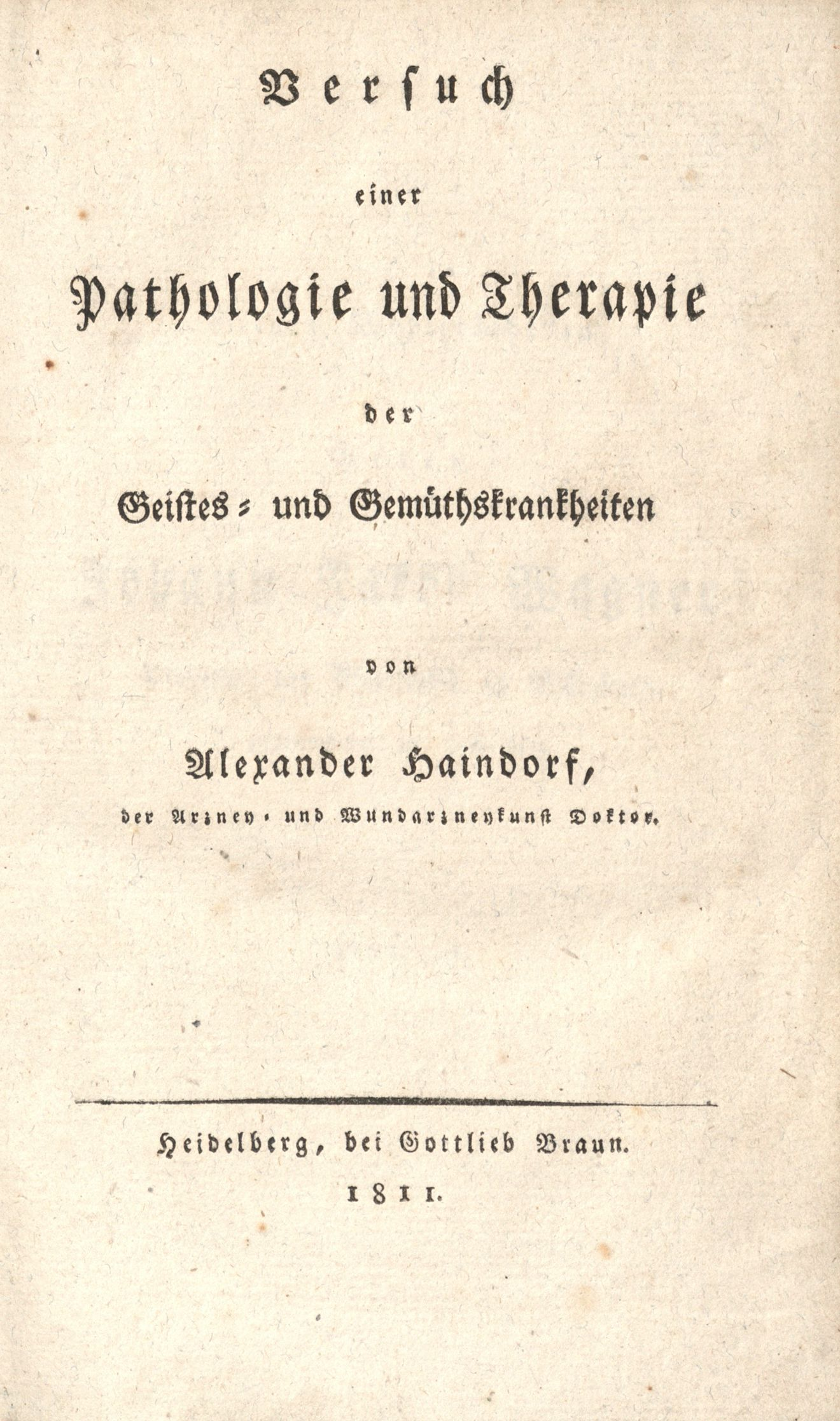
Title page of the book

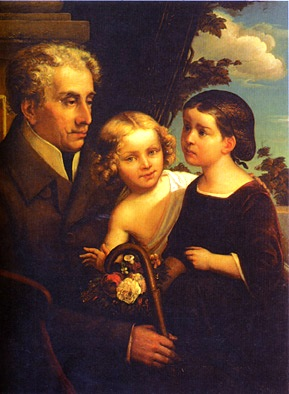

Versuch einer Pathologie und Therapie der Geistes- und Gemüthskrankheiten (English: A Pathology and Therapy of Emotional and Mental diseases) is written by the German author Alexander Haindorf (1784–1862), which was published in 1811. It is one of the first psychiatric textbooks of German origin and probably the first published by a physician. The book discusses mental and emotional diseases with a focus on possible interventions. The main ideas include a balance and imbalance of mental health and the possibility of rebalancing with the help of physical, medical and therapeutic interventions.

== Context ==
The author Alexander Haindorf was one of the most important Jewish persons of 19th century in the Prussian Province of Westphalia. He successfully visited the Gymnasium, the highest secondary schooling in Germany, and continued to study, philosophy, history, literature, medicine and psychology in Würzburg, Erlangen, Bamberg and Heidelberg. During his time in Würzburg, Haindorf was taught by the German philosopher Jakob Wagner whom he met again when doing his doctorate 1810 in Heidelberg. Haindorf started teaching the subject mental health in Heidelberg. In 1811 he published his postdoctorate thesis "Versuch einer Pathologie und Therapie der Geistes- und Gemüthskrankheiten" (English: A Pathology and Therapy of Emotional and Mental diseases), which was dedicated to his former teacher Jakob Wagner. Haindorf was also one of the first Germans to write a psychiatric textbook and the first German to write a psychiatric textbook who was an actual doctor. Alexander Haindorf was one of the first to suggest that a serious cause of mental illness, along with physiological reasons, is inner conflict within the individual.

The terminology of the book largely corresponds to Schelling's philosophy of the middle period. This is characterised for example by the tendency to systematization, which lets him distinguish, for example, four stages of imbecility. Typical for his time period, Haindorf does not recognise clear lines between healthy and unhealthy, normal and abnormal mental states, leading to the recognition of alleged incipient mental illness everywhere. Schelling published his view on the mind in the same year of Handorfs publication, and was largely quoted by him. According to Schelling the soul is the impersonal "rapport to God" to which the spirit and emotions were subservient. The disease is an interruption of this rapport. When passion defeats emotions, an emotional disturbance occurs. Madness is caused by an interruption in the communication between the soul and the faculty of understanding with the spirit. These thoughts display a large similarity to Haindorfs book. The view of the soul as described by Schiller and later Haindorf was largely rejected at that time. It contrasts the traditional, strong commitment to religion and philosophy and excludes religious feelings.

German psychiatric literature in the 18th and early 19th century often described spiritual or demonic reasons for mental illness, standing in contrast to Haindorfs biological, science-based approach to the matter. The book was among the first of many of that time to start looking into scientific reasons behind mental problems. The "father of American psychiatry" Dr Benjamin Rush released his first psychiatric textbook, which was the first in the United States, one year after Haindorf in 1812. Rush believed that mental illness is a disease of the mind rather than the possession by demons. Other well-known psychologists at that time, for example, Ernst Feuchtersleben (1806–1849) considered mental illness to be a result of developmental problems. According to him, these mental states are normal but not fully developed. Friedrich Groos (1768–1852) defined mental health as a state of harmony between natural forces and the behaviour of an individual. He considered illnesses to result from natural forces being blocked. These views all appear in the book written by Haindorf. His work reflects broad and specific trends in psychiatry during the 18th and 19th centuries. One example is a successful intervention for mental illnesses Haindorf describes being the use of belladonna and hyoscyamus.

== Content ==
=== Structure ===
The book consists of 336 pages in which the author discusses a total of 86 subtopics. It is divided into two volumes, four chapters each. The first volume focuses on mood disorders. Including chapters about egoism, sexuality and overall well-being. The chapter about egoism includes egoism in animals and where and why humans have egoism. Haindorf describes the symptoms of an animal's egoism falling ill and compares them to humans with egoism falling ill. He also describes possible forms of treatment and investigates the reason behind the sickness. The second chapter focuses on feelings and the system of the senses. Again first going over the definition and then focus on sickness, symptoms and treatment. Covetousness and its diseases are analysed in the first part of chapter three. This chapter focuses on different forms of sexual desire and its sickness, however, also desire for food, happiness and other things are being investigated. As with the other chapters focussing on definition, symptoms, causes and treatment with the addition in this chapter of consequences when not treated properly. The second smaller part of chapter three addresses sickness in the feeling of self including different kinds, causes and treatments.

The second volume focuses on mental disorders. This book consists of chapters covering imagination, clear thinking, phantasy and decision making. The first chapter discusses mental diseases including dreaming, the active soul and sickness of the brain. The second chapter examines imagination. Inner and outer sense, attention, causes and healing are being described. The third chapter addresses decision-making and different levels of problems in decision-making. As with the other chapters, chapter three also includes causes and possible treatments. The last chapter covers phantasy and sanity.

=== Main ideas ===
Haindorfs work includes ideas of Nature-Philosophy. He compared life to of an individual to a galvanic process acting between positive and negative poles; forces of composition and decomposition, or creation and destruction. Life is about balance, and if the balance is disrupted, negative symptoms arise which can only be treated by regaining balance. The soul and being of a human consists of many smaller parts that need to work in harmony. The soul in its highest purest meaning is equal to the soul of the world, the principal of the real and the ideal in the universe. If the parts are mixed up and unorganised, information is being processed in the same matter. According to Haindorf, the reason behind mental illness is the misguided purpose of a man's life. The perception of reality and the mind itself is therefore disturbed in those patients. Reality is being mixed up and daily life disturbed. There are multiple ways to regain balance. The main one is to align oneself with one's true purpose. The professor also recognised the connection between body and mind. He wrote about the connections between hormones in the nervous system, the brain's physical attributes, and born disabilities with mental well-being. Some people, according to Haindorf, are born unbalanced and thus are unable to regain balance during their lifetime and remain mentally diseased. For most patients with mental and mood disorders, there would be a treatment option though, that may help to regain some level of balance.

== Reception ==
The book was among the publications of Reil and Hofbauer one of the first German psychiatric textbooks as well as probably the first German psychiatric textbook published by a doctor. The psychiatric text itself had little if any influence at the time of publication. The book had an impact on the author's life, which himself has had a great historical impact in Germany. Because of Haindorfs first publication, he gained a reputation as a specialist in mental and emotional illnesses. His book was well received and one of the reasons his request to become a private lecturer was accepted. It was also included in his request to carry the title professor, which was denied. In 1813 Haindorf moved to Paris until 1814 to further study psychiatry at a mental health facility. His experience in France resulted in the publication of "Beiträgen zur Culturgeschichte der Medizin und Chirurgie Frankreichs und vorzüglich seiner Hauptstadt" (English. Contributions to the cultural history of medicine and surgery in France and particularly its capital city) Göttingen,1815, which was the second out of his numerous publications.

The book is part of special collections including the Maastricht University Special Collections.
