= Haus Bamenohl =

Coordinates: 51°09′43″N 07°59′14″E

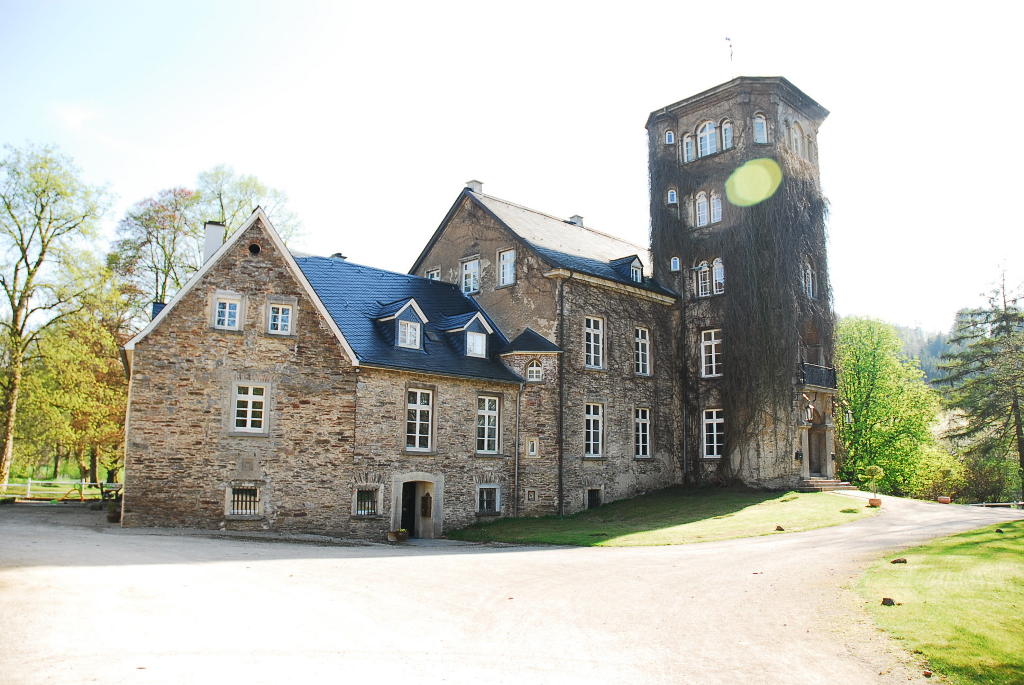
Haus Bamenohl, front

Haus Bamenohl is a castle in the village of Bamenohl, municipality of Finnentrop, Olpe district in North Rhine-Westphalia, Germany.

== History ==
=== 14th to 17th century ===
The first owner of the Haus Bamenohl was probably the family von Hundem genannt Pepersack. By marriage, the von Heygen family came into the possession of Bamenohl. On March 5, 1324 Bawenole inferiore was first mentioned in a document by Herbord von Heygen. The cellar vaults and the 2-meter thick walls suggest construction during the 14th or 15th century. At this time there was already a chapel, which is mentioned for the first time in 1362.

Around 1433 the von Plettenberg family came into possession of Haus Bamenohl. In the 16th century the property was divided into a so-called "lower house" (Niederbamenohl and an "upper house" (Oberbamenohl) referring to the direction of the nearby Lenne river. The lower house was a part of the present castle core, the upper house was situated only a few meters southwest of it.

In 1647, Adam Vogt von Elspe built a new house, today the east wing of the castle, IN GREAT WAR AND STRIFE AND REPULSIVENESS, as inscribed on a stone, referring to the Thirty Years' War that ravaged Westphalia at this time. The new building could only outlast the war because the family had several letters of protection, sparing the house from robbery and looting.

=== 18th century ===
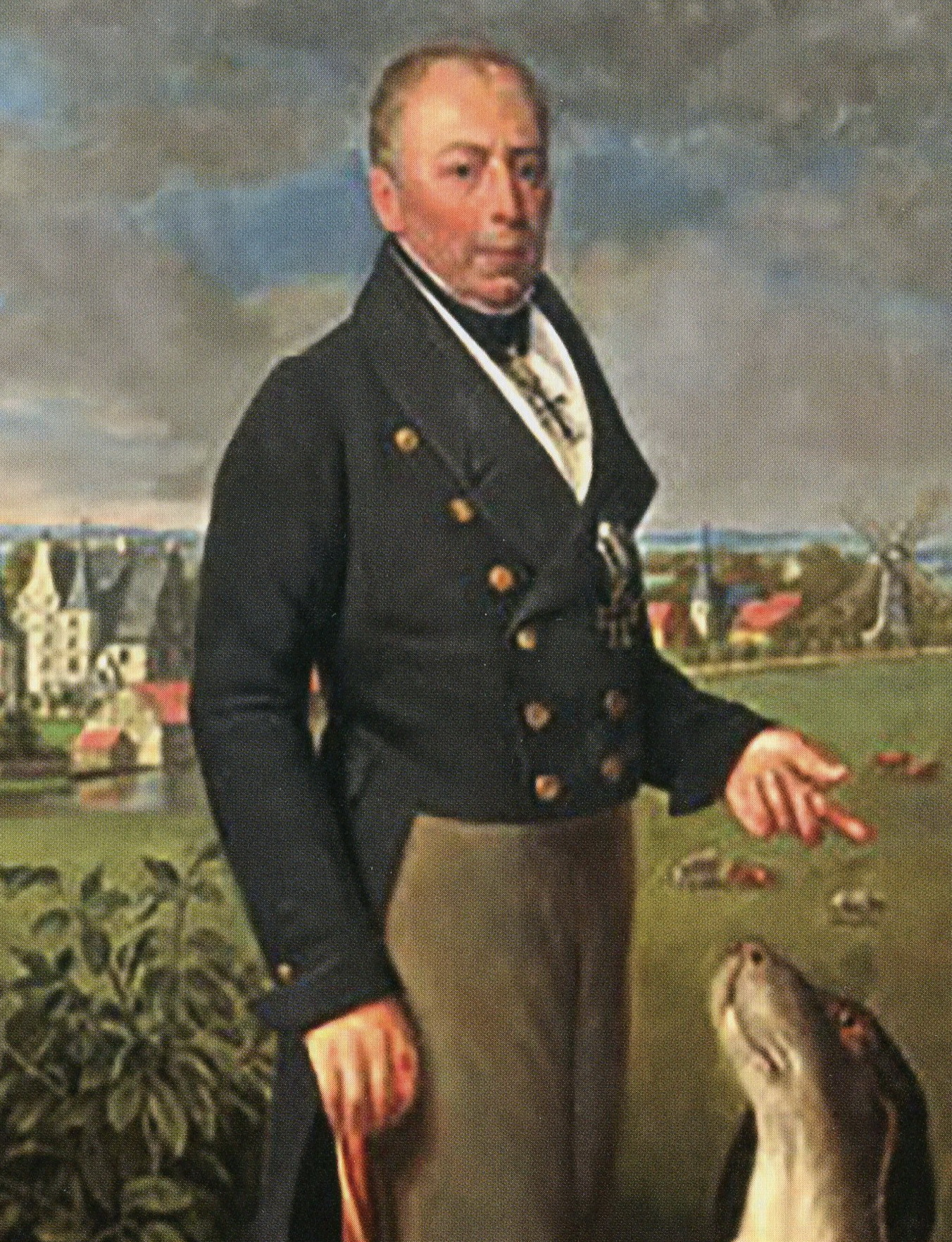
Karl Wilhelm Georg von Plettenberg-Heeren

In 1781 Moritz Georg Vogt von Elspe called Voss zu Rodenberg and the last Vogt von Elspe, owner of the lower house, purchased the upper house from abbess Caroline von Dalwigk zu Neuenheerse and thus united Oberbamenohl and Niederbamenohl. In 1784, the buildings of the upper house were demolished.

When Moritz Georg died, his niece Christine Anna Luise Gisbertine von Bodelschwingh (* 1766 Haus Bodelschwingh, † 1833 ibid.), inherited the estates of Oevinghausen, Schwerte, Westhemmerde, Werl, Bamenohl and Borghausen. Through her marriage to Freiherr Karl Wilhelm Georg von Plettenberg (* 1765 Haus Heeren, † 1850 on Draiser Hof), Erbmarschall (hereditary marshal) of the County of Mark, Grand Master of the Teutonic Order, in Utrecht and Grand Master of the Order of Freemasons, Haus Bamenohl returned to the Plettenberg family. He later added his wife's last name to his own.

His son Freiherr Gisbert von Bodelschwingh-Plettenberg (* 1790 Haus Bodelschwingh, † 1866 ibid.) inherited Bamenohl, Borghausen, Bodelschwingh, Schwarzenberg, Rodenberg, Schörlingen, as well as Geretzhoven, Katz and Katzcherhof in the Duchy of Jülich, Teschendorf in Farther Pomerania, Drais in the Duchy of Nassau and Huis Loowaard in the province of Gelderland. He was elected in 1826 for life to the Upper House of the Westphalian provincial parliament (Provinziallandtag).

=== 19th and 20th century ===
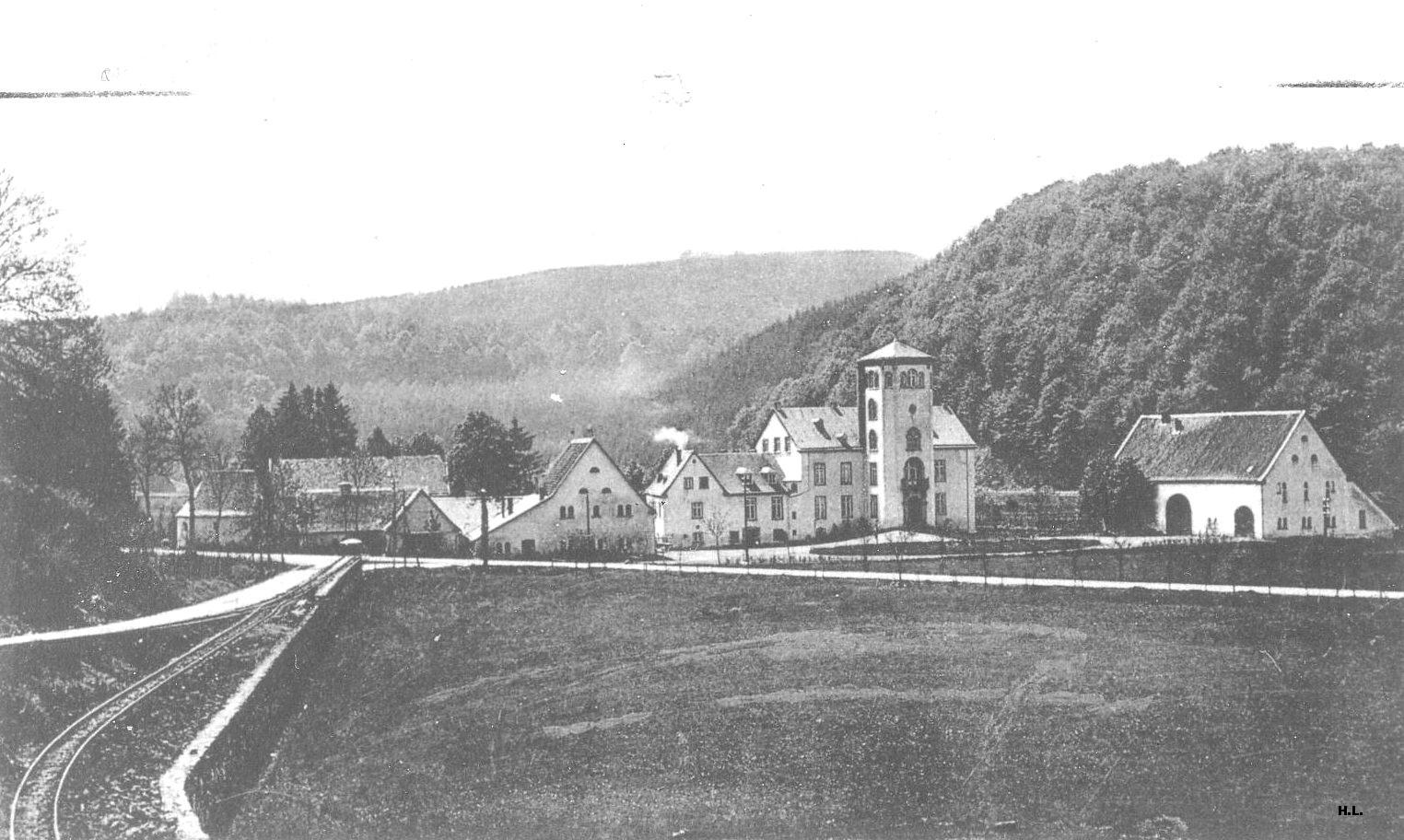
Haus Bamenohl around 1900

The ruins of the upper house Oberbamenohl were removed in 1851 by the son of Gisbert, Graf Carl Gisbert Wilhelm von Bodelschwingh-Plettenberg (* 1821 Burg Geretzhoven, † 1907 Haus Bodelschwingh) who also filled the moat that surrounded the property from three sides. In addition, he upgraded from 1851 to 1853 the former lower house Niederbamenohl (today's castle) to its present appearance. In particular, he built the tower and set up the English landscape garden.

After the death of his father, Carl moved to Haus Bodelschwingh in 1866 and handed over Haus Bamenohl to his brother Adolf Eugen Ludwig von Bodelschwingh-Plettenberg (* 1826 Burg Geretzhoven, † 1902 Haus Heeren). 1856 he married his cousin Bertha von Plettenberg-Heeren (* 1832, † 1900), owner of the estates Heeren, Hilbeck, Werve and Hahnen. The couple moved to Haus Heeren and Haus Bamenohl was used as summer residence.

After World War II Haus Bamenohl served as accommodation for refugees from the former eastern territories of Germany, later it was converted into a nursing home, leaving a run-down building in 1967 when it closed. After a vacancy of about 20 years, a successive renovation of the castle and the three surrounding buildings (Forester's lodge, barn and carriage house) began.

== Today ==
The ensemble of castle, courtyard and garden with its ponds is a listed cultural heritage site. The buildings are inhabited, but visits to the castle and gardens are possible by prior arrangement. Rooms on the ground floor can be rented for events, especially civil marriages.

The annual Open-air concerts in the courtyard have become a popular event on the third weekend of August.
