= Eibach (company) =

German automobile suspension manufacturing company

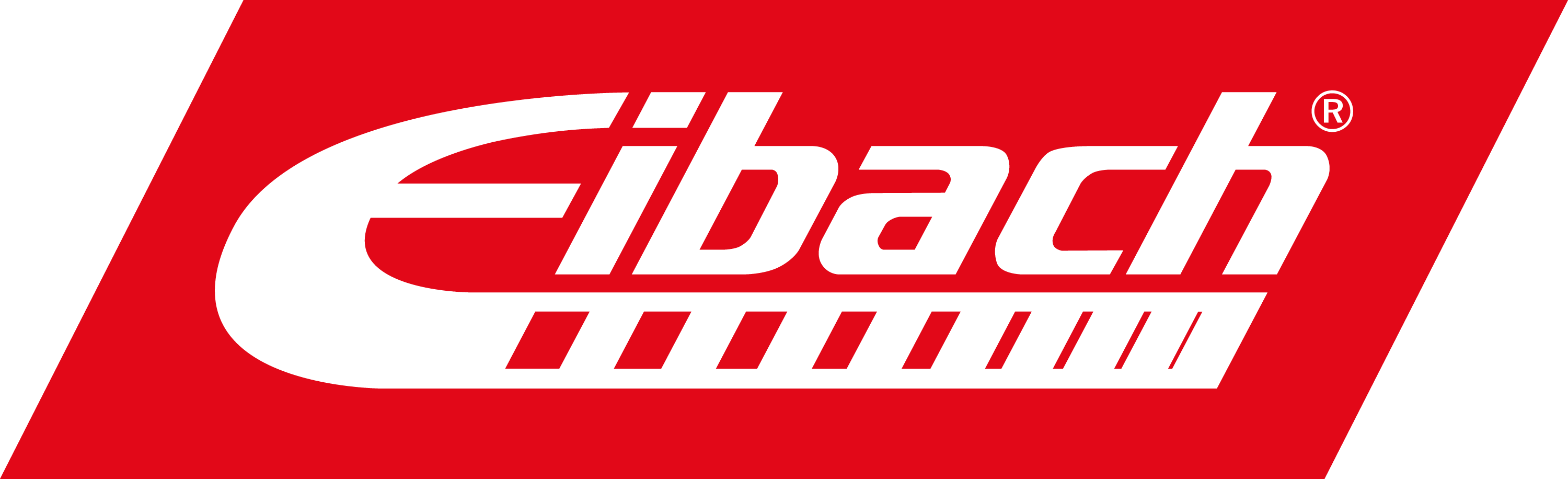
- Type: GmbH
- Industry: Automotive
- Founded: 1951 in Rönkhausen
- Founder: Heinrich Eibach
- Headquarters: Finnentrop, North Rhine-Westphalia, Germany
- Key people: Markus Simon; Jürgen Schulte
- Products: Automotive parts
- Number of employees: 350 (group approx. 500)
- Website: https://www.eibach.de/

Heinrich Eibach GmbH is a German company that has specialized in the development and production of suspension and chassis systems for the automotive industry and also manufactures special technical springs for a wide variety of other industrial applications. The company is part of the globally active Eibach Group, which - with Eibach Industries as the parent company - is organized as a holding structure.

== History ==
The Eibach company was founded in Rönkhausen in 1951 by Heinrich Eibach, the father or grandfather of the current owner or managing director. The company's founder died in 1967, whereupon his son Wilfried Eibach took over the company management together with Walter Korte. Until the 1970s, springs were only manufactured for industrial applications. It was only with the advent of the German car tuning industry that springs for vehicles began to be developed and manufactured. The chassis technology division was founded in 1975 and Eibach Oberflächentechnik (EOT) was founded in 1981. The internationalization of the company was further advanced by the establishment of the subsidiaries Eibach Springs, USA (1987), Eibach Japan (1994), Eibach UK (1996) and Eibach South East Asia, Australia (1997/8).

In 2000 the Eibach Group was restructured under the Eibach AG holding company. In 2009 the group generated sales of 60 million euros. In 2013/14, a new 10,000 square meter production plant was built at the company's headquarters in Finnentrop for a sum in the double-digit millions. In 2016, the company also entered the aftermarket.

Today, the company is one of the leading manufacturers in its branch. Eibach has production plants in Germany, the United States and China. Subsidiaries are located in the United States, England, Japan, Australia, China, and South Africa, which means that the company is represented on five continents.

With around 500 employees, customers in 80 countries are supplied. The company is also represented as an exhibitor at important trade fairs, such as the IAA or Marintec in Shanghai.

== Products ==
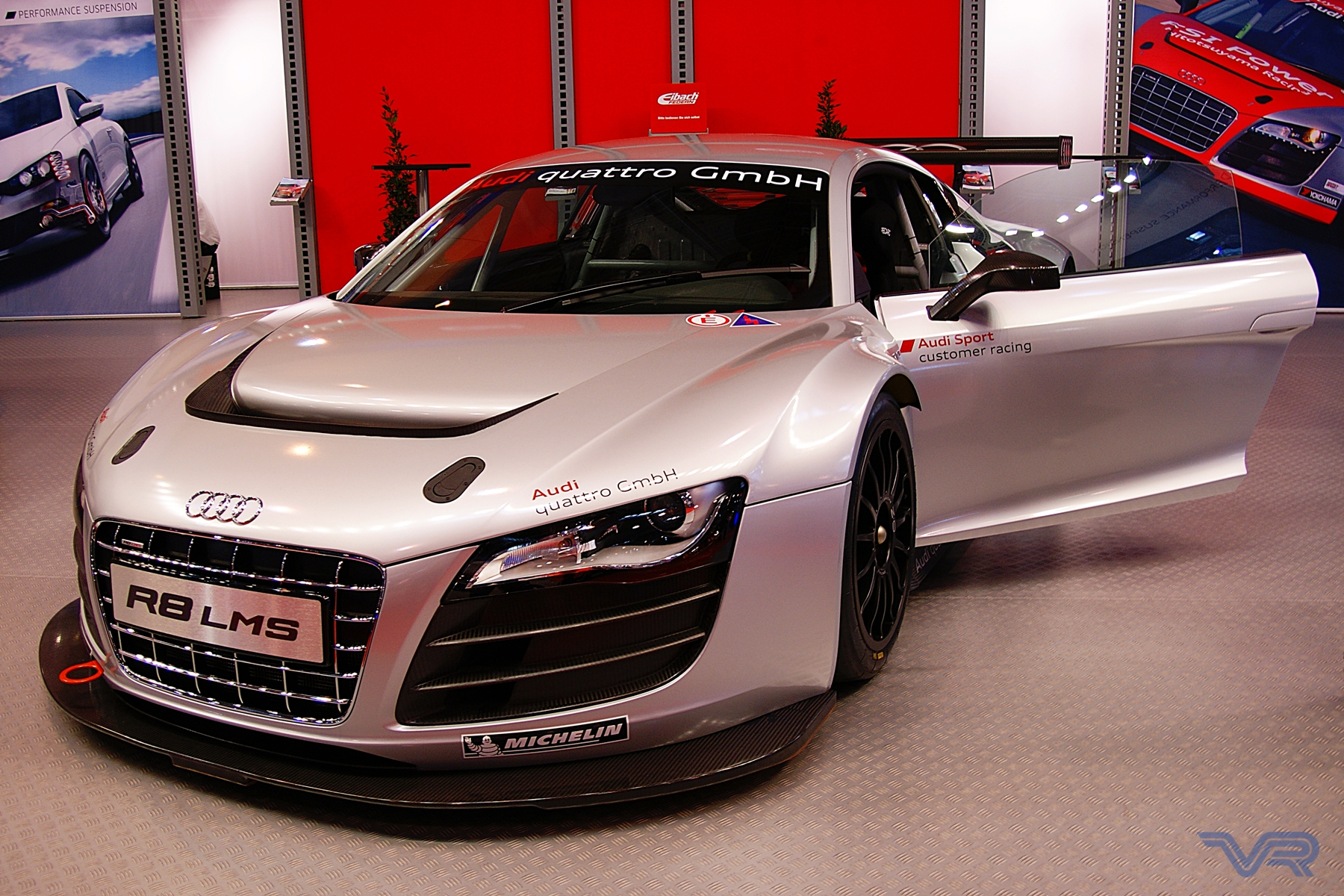
Audi R8 LMS with suspension by official supplier Eibach

Heinrich Eibach GmbH operates in four product areas:

- Springs for industrial applications
- Original equipment manufacturer (OEM) or Original Equipment Supplier (OES) for springs and dampers for the automotive industry
- Suspensions, suspension systems and components for auto racing
- Surface technology (Eibach Oberflächentechnik GmbH in Lüdenscheid)

Heinrich Eibach products are used by teams in various racing series such as Formula One, DTM, WRC, NASCAR, IndyCar and WTCC/WTCR. For example, Eibach was a development partner and official supplier of Audi Sport and equipped all of the DTM Audi A4 and Audi R8 LMS with racing springs.

Eibach is a world market leader in particularly high-quality vehicle springs, such as those used in small-series sports cars from Bugatti, Lamborghini or Lotus, for example. In addition, almost all Formula 1 teams are supplied with springs. Eibach springs are also used in toy devices or in nuclear power plants; They are also used for earthquake protection under residential buildings.
