= Carl Anton Baumstark =

German orientalist

Carl Anton Joseph Maria Dominikus Baumstark (4 August 1872 in Konstanz – 31 May 1948 in Bonn) was a German Orientalist, philologist and liturgist. His main area of study was Oriental liturgical history, its development and its influence on literature, culture and art. His grandfather, Anton Baumstark (1800–1876), was a noted philologist.

He studied classical and Oriental philology, obtaining his habilitation for both subjects in 1898 at Heidelberg. In 1899, he relocated to Rome, where in 1901, he became an editor of the academic journal Oriens Christianus. Later on, he worked for 15 years as an instructor at a Roman Catholic secondary school in Sasbach, Baden.

In 1921 he became an honorary professor in Bonn, then served as a professor of Semitic studies and comparative liturgal science at Nijmegen (from 1923), followed by a professorship of Arabic and Islamic studies at the University of Utrecht (from 1926). From 1930 to 1935, he was a professor of Oriental studies at the University of Münster.

He joined the Nazi party in 1932, but was sent into emeritate in 1935, apparently after being accused of homosexuality. He began doubting his Nazi affiliation in 1943, and in 1944 supported the cause of Kilian Kirchhoff, who had been sentenced to death; Baumstark unsuccessfully asked for mercy.

== Selected works ==
- Comparative liturgy, revised by Bernard Botte; English edition by F.L. Cross. Westminster, Md.: Newman Press, 1958.
- On the historical development of the liturgy (Vom geschichtlichen Werden der Liturgie, 1923); intr., transl. by Fritz West; foreword by Robert F. Taft. Collegeville, Minn.: Liturgical Press 2011.
- Lucubrationes Syro-Graecae, 1894 – Syriac-Greco lucubrations.
- Syrisch-arabische Biographieen des Aristoteles. Syrische Kommentare zur Eisagoge des Porphyrios, Leipzig: Teubner, 1900.
- Die christlichen literaturen des Orients, 1911 – Christian literature of the Orient.
- Geschichte der syrischen Literatur: mit Ausschluss der christlich-palästinensischen Texte, 1922 – History of Syriac literature: with the exclusion of the Christian-Palestinian texts.
