= Anton Baumstark =

German classical philologist

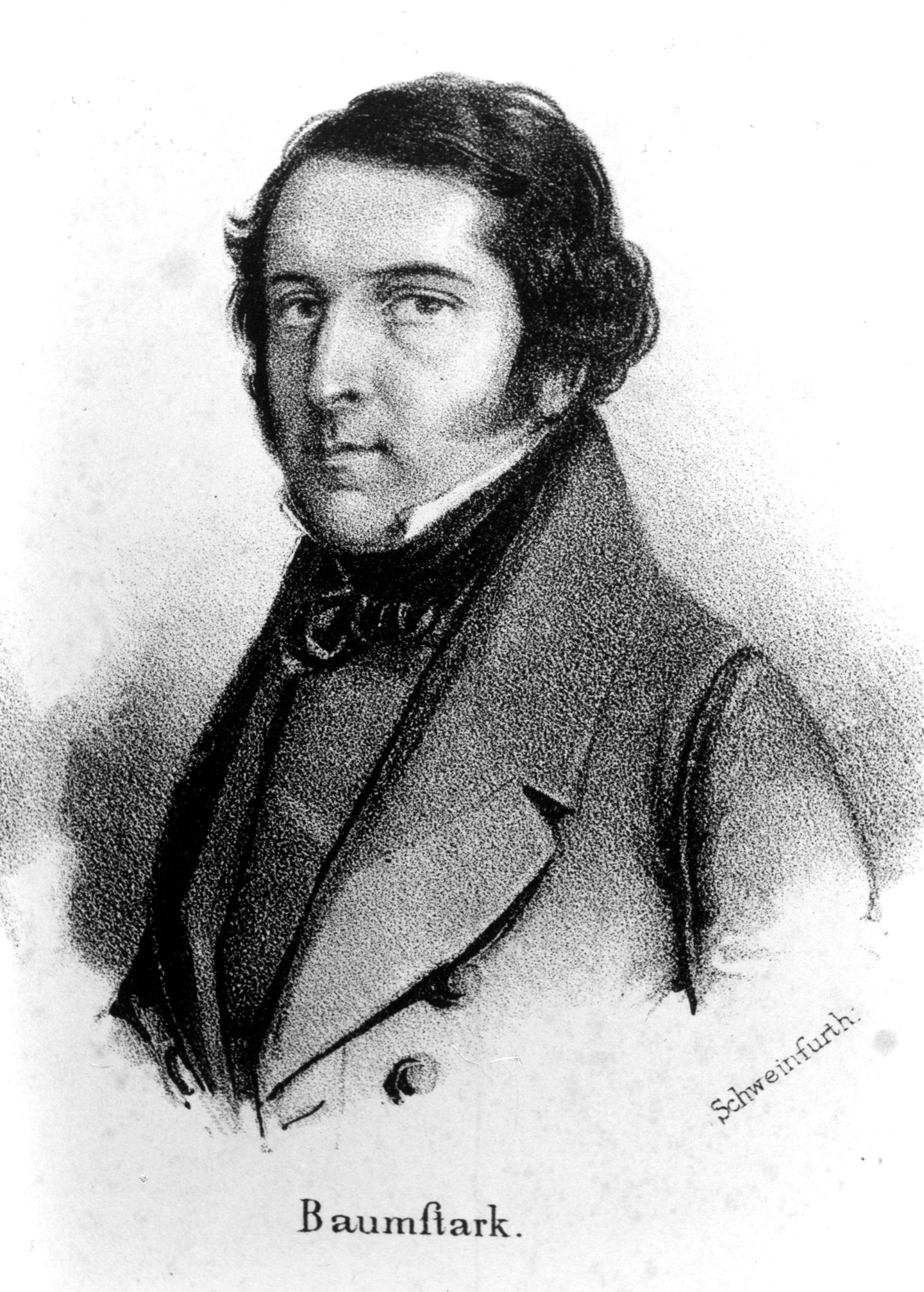
- Born: 14 April 1800; Sinzheim
- Died: 2 February 1876 (aged 75); Freiburg im Breisgau
- Relatives: Eduard Baumstark (brother); Reinhold Baumstark (son); Carl Anton Baumstark (grandson)

Academic background
- Education: University of Heidelberg
- Academic advisors: Friedrich Christoph Schlosser; Georg Friedrich Creuzer

Academic work
- Discipline: Classical philology
- Institutions: Lyceum in Freiburg im Breisgau; University of Freiburg

Anton Baumstark (14 April 1800 in Sinzheim – 2 February 1876 in Freiburg im Breisgau) was a German classical philologist. He was the brother of economist Eduard Baumstark (1807–1889) and the father of historian Reinhold Baumstark (1831–1900). His grandson, Carl Anton Baumstark (1872–1948), was a noted orientalist and liturgist.

He studied philology at the University of Heidelberg, where his instructors included Friedrich Christoph Schlosser and Georg Friedrich Creuzer. Beginning in 1826 he taught classes at the Lyceum in Freiburg im Breisgau, and in 1836, was appointed professor of classical philology at the University of Freiburg as well as director of the philological seminar.

== Selected works ==
- "De curatoribus emporii et nautodicis apud Athenienses", 1827.
- "Caesaris de bello commentarii gallico et civili", 1828.
- "Lectiones Tullianae", 1832, (Lessons of Tullian).
- "Cajus Julius Cäsar's Werke", 1835–40, (Works by Caius Julius Caesar).
- "Ausführliche Erläuterung des allgemeinen Theiles der Germania des Tacitus", 1875.
