= Sinzheim =

- Municipality
- Coat of arms

- Location of Sinzheim within Rastatt district
- Interactive map of Sinzheim
- Location within Germany Location within Baden-Württemberg
- Coordinates: 48°45′43″N 08°10′01″E
- Country: Germany
- State: Baden-Württemberg
- Admin. region: Karlsruhe
- District: Rastatt

Government
  - Mayor (2017–25): Erik Ernst

Area
  - Total: 28.50 km^{2} (11.00 sq mi)
- Elevation: 128 m (420 ft)

Population (2025-12-31)
  - Total: 11,547
  - Density: 405.2/km^{2} (1,049/sq mi)
- Time zone: UTC+01:00 (CET)
  - Summer (DST): UTC+02:00 (CEST)
- Postal codes: 76547
- Dialling codes: 07221
- Vehicle registration: RA
- Website: www.sinzheim.de

Sinzheim is a municipality in the district of Rastatt, in Baden-Württemberg, Germany. It is located 6 km west of Baden-Baden, and 11 km south of Rastatt.

== Mayors ==
- Franz Zoller: (1912–2002) 1957–1977
- Hans Metzner: (born 1951) 1977–2009

In May 2009 Erik Ernst was elected mayor with nearly 64% of the votes.

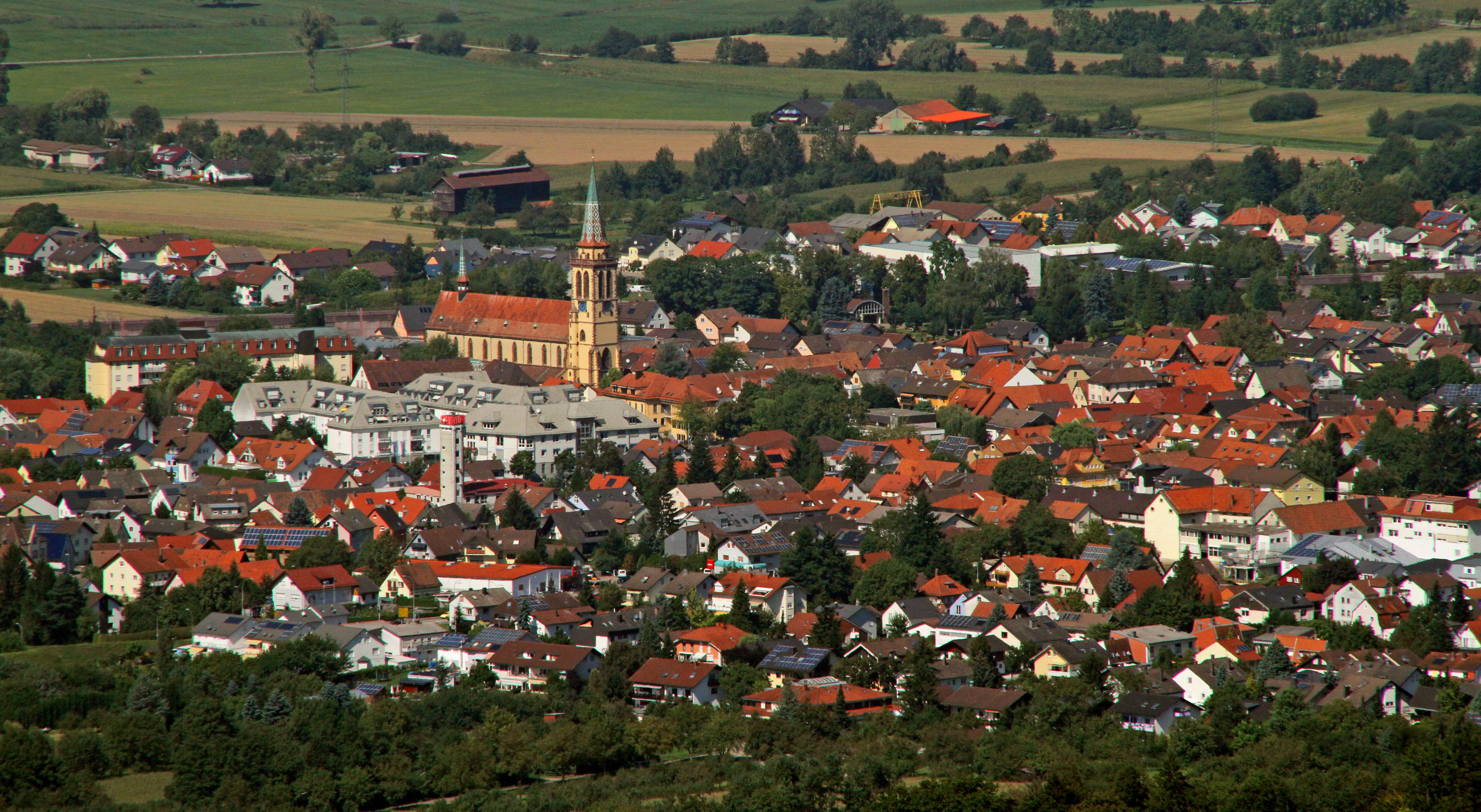
Center of Sinzheim

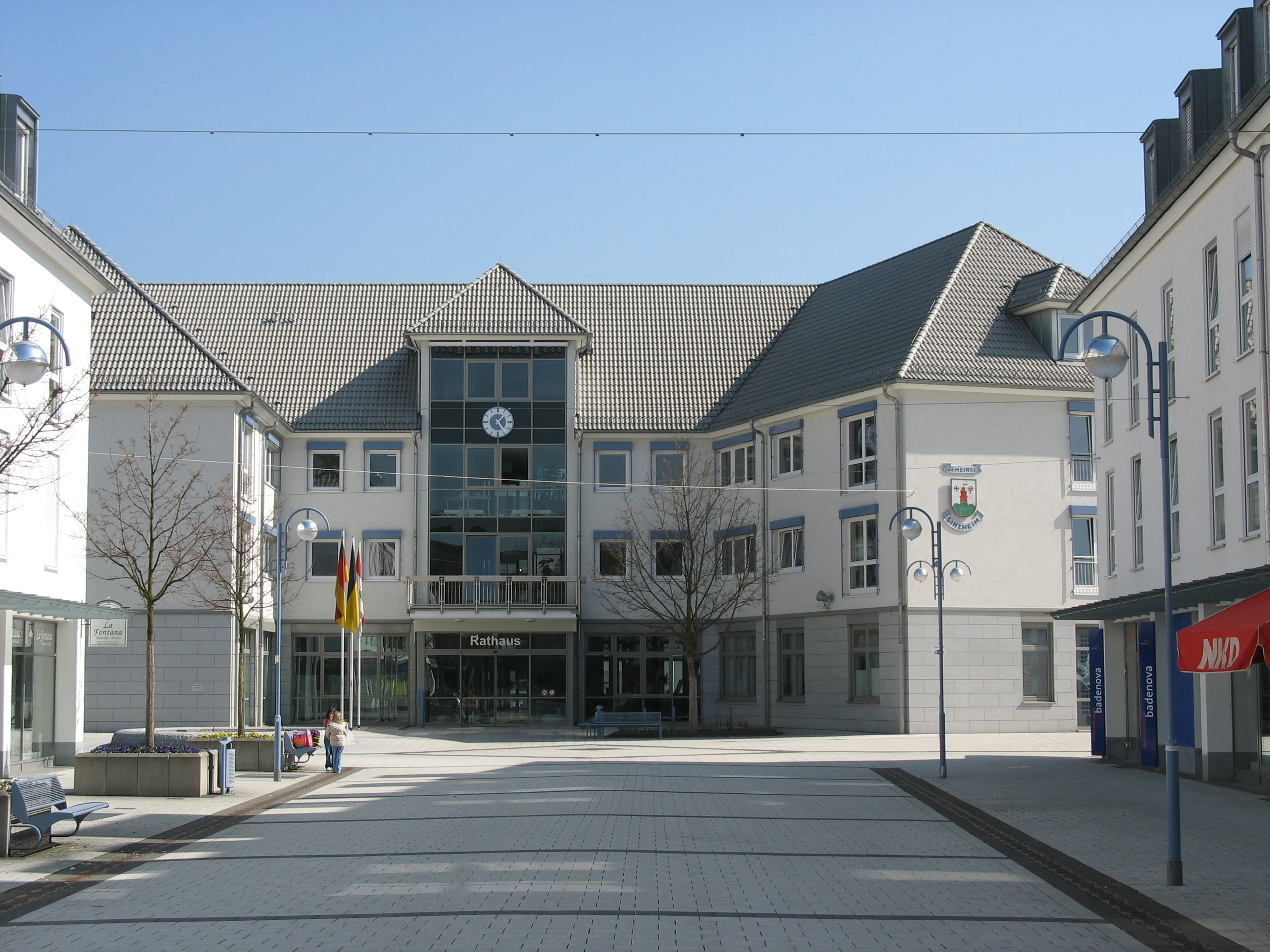
Town hall (Rathaus 2006)

=== Sons and daughters of the community ===
- Anton Baumstark (1800–1876), philologist
- Lothar von Kübel (1823–1881), bishop, diocesan rector in Freiburg im Breisgau
