= Sandrine Blazy =

French computer scientist

Sandrine Blazy is a French computer scientist known for her research in the formal verification of compilers, and especially for her work as a developer of CompCert, a compiler for a large subset of C99 that is "the first industrial-strength compiler with a mechanically checked proof of correctness". She is a professor at the University of Rennes and deputy director of IRISA, the Institut de recherche en informatique et systèmes aléatoires of the University of Rennes and the French National Centre for Scientific Research.

== Education and career ==
Blazy studied computer science as an undergraduate through the École nationale supérieure d'informatique pour l'industrie et l'entreprise (ENSIIE) and Sorbonne University, earning both an engineering degree from ENSIIE and a master's degree from the Sorbonne in 1990. She completed a Ph.D. in 1993, and received a habilitation in 2008 at the University of Évry Val d'Essonne.

She worked as a lecturer at ENSIIE from 1994 to 2009, when she moved to her present position as a professor at the University of Rennes. She became deputy director of IRISA in 2021.

== Recognition ==
Blazy was part of a group of software developers honored twice by the Association for Computing Machinery for their work on CompCert, with the 2021 ACM Software System Award and the 2022 ACM SIGPLAN Programming Languages Software Award.

In 2023, Blazy received the CNRS Silver Medal.
