= Patrick Cousot =

French computer scientist (born 1948)

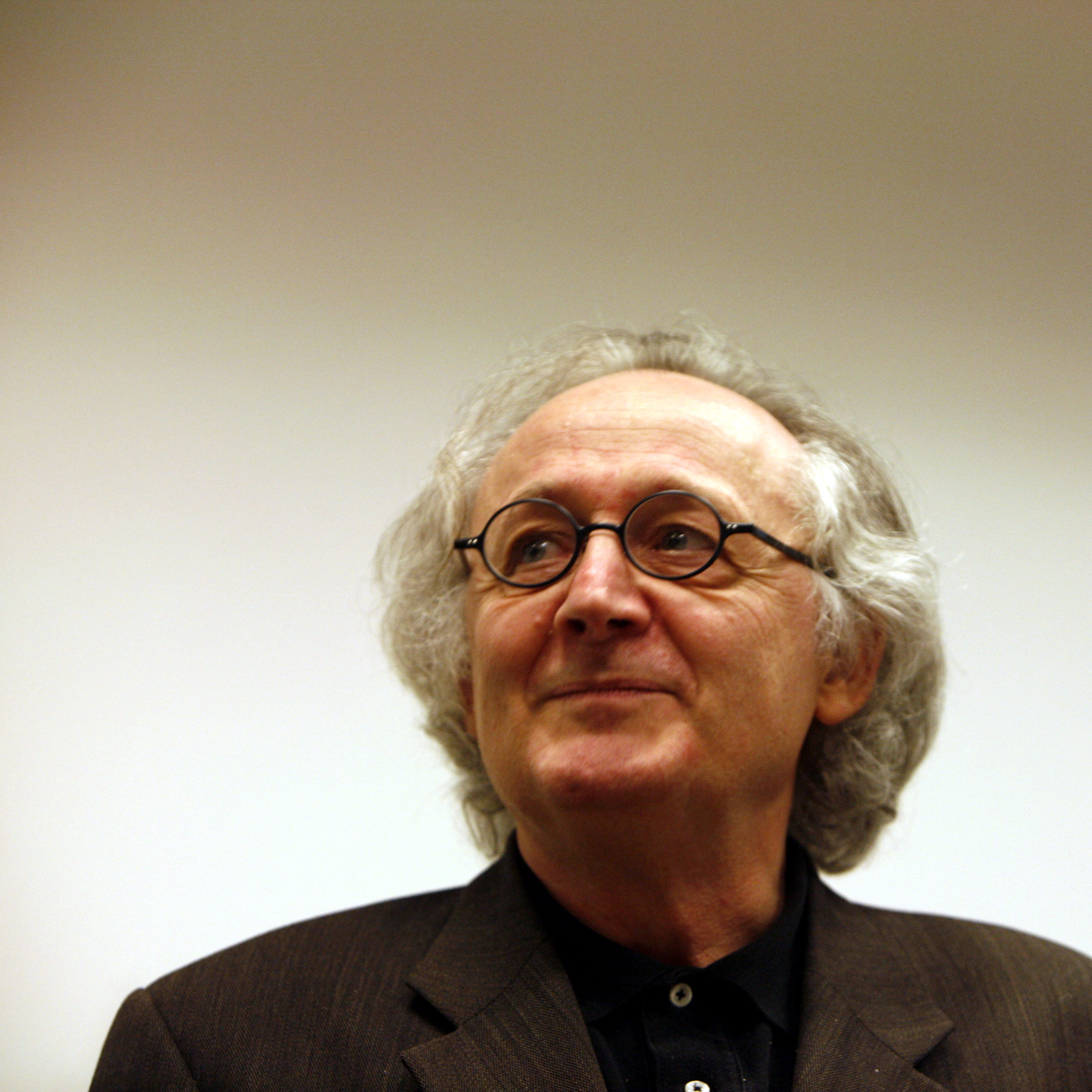
- December 2007
- Born: 3 December 1948 (age 77)
- Education: École Nationale Supérieure des Mines de Nancy, Université Joseph Fourier Grenoble I
- Known for: Abstract interpretation
- Spouse: Radhia Cousot
- Awards: CNRS Silver Medal Great prize of the EADS Foundation honorary doctorates by Saarland University and Ca' Foscari University of Venice; ACM SIGPLAN Programming Languages Achievement Award; IEEE Computer Society Harlan D. Mills Award; IEEE John von Neumann Medal; ACM Fellow EATCS Award
- Scientific career
- Theses: Définition interprétative et implantation de langages de programmation (1974); Méthodes itératives de construction et d'approximation de points fixes d'opérateurs monotones sur un treillis, analyse sémantique des programmes (1978)
- Doctoral advisor: Michael Griffiths (1974), Philippe Jorrand (1978)

Patrick Cousot (born 3 December 1948) is a French computer scientist, currently Silver Professor of Computer Science at the Courant Institute of Mathematical Sciences, New York University, USA. Before he was Professor at the École Normale Supérieure (ENS), Paris, France, he was at the École Polytechnique, Palaiseau, France and the University of Metz, France and was a Research Scientist at the French National Center for Scientific Research (CNRS) at the Joseph Fourier University, Grenoble, France.

Together with his wife Radhia Cousot (1947–2014), Patrick Cousot is the originator of abstract interpretation, an influential technique in formal methods. In the 2000s, he has worked on practical methods of static analysis for critical embedded software (Astrée), such as found in avionics.

In 1999 he received the CNRS Silver Medal and in 2006 the great prize of the EADS Foundation. In 2001, he was bestowed an honorary doctorate by Saarland University, Germany. With Radhia Cousot, he received the ACM SIGPLAN Programming Languages Achievement Award in 2013 and the IEEE Computer Society Harlan D. Mills award in 2014, "For the invention of 'abstract interpretation', development of tool support, and its practical application". He received a Humboldt Research Award in 2008 and the 2018 IEEE John von Neumann Medal "for introducing abstract interpretation, a powerful framework for automatically calculating program properties with broad application to verification and optimisation". In 2020 Cousot was recognized ACM Fellow "for contributions to programming languages through the invention and development of abstract interpretation". In 2022, Cousot was awarded an honorary doctorate from Ca' Foscari University of Venice. He received the 2022 EATCS award, which is given by EATCS to acknowledge extensive and widely recognized contributions to theoretical computer science over a life long scientific career. He is a knight (Chevalier) in the Ordre National du Mérite and the Ordre des Palmes académiques, member of the Academia Europaea, Informatics section (since 2006) and member of the Board of Trustees at the IMDEA Software Institute.
