= List of tools for static code analysis =

This is a list of notable tools for static program analysis (program analysis is a synonym for code analysis).

== Static code analysis tools ==
Tool	Latest release	Free software	Languages supported							Notes
Tool	Latest release	Free software	Ada	C, C++, C#, Objective-C	JVM	JavaScript, TypeScript	.NET, VB.NET	Python	Other languages	Notes
Astrée	2024-10 (24.10)	No; proprietary	—	C, C++	—	—	—	—	—	Finds all potential runtime errors and data races by abstract interpretation, can prove their absence and functional assertions; tailored toward safety-critical C, C++ code (e.g., avionics and automotive); includes MISRA checker
Axivion Suite	2025-05-19 (7.10)	No; proprietary	—	C, C++, C#	—	—	—	—	QML, Axivion CUDA	Static code analysis suite designed for safety-critical and security-focused software development with certification support for ISO 26262, IEC 61508, IEC 62304, EN 50128, and EN 50657; comprehensive analysis includes coding standards compliance (MISRA C/C++, AUTOSAR, CERT, CWE), clone detecting, dead code analysis, architecture verifying, cycle detecting, and metrics monitoring; includes qualification kit for regulated environments as in automotive, aerospace, medical devices, security
BLAST (retired)	2015-10-30 (2.7.3)	Yes; ASL 2	—	C	—	—	—	—	—	Open-source software model checker for C programs based on lazy abstraction (successor project is CPAchecker)
Clang	2026-10-05 (23.1.2)	Yes; ASL 2 with LLVM Exceptions	—	C, C++, Objective-C	—	—	—	—	—	Open-source compiler that includes static analyzer, as of version 3.2, analyzer is included in Xcode
Coccinelle	2021-09-06 (1.1.1)	Yes; GPLv2	—	C	—	—	—	—	—	Open-source source code pattern matching and transforming
Code Dx (Defunct 2021)	2015-01-15	No; proprietary	—	C, C++, C#	Java, JSP, Scala	JavaScript	VB.NET	Python	PHP, Rails, Ruby, XML	Software application vulnerability correlation and management system; uses multiple SAST and DAST tools, and results of manual code reviews; can calculate cyclomatic complexity
CodePeer	2021-05-07 (21)	No; proprietary	Ada	—	—	—	—	—	—	Advanced static analysis tool; detects potential run-time logic errors in Ada programs
CodeScene	2023-10-13 (6.3.5)	No; proprietary	—	C, C++, C#, Objective-C	Java, Groovy, Scala	JavaScript, TypeScript	VB.NET	Python	Swift, Go, PHP, Ruby	Behavioral analysis of code; helps identify, prioritize, and manage technical debt; measures organizational aspects of developer teams; automated pull request integrations
CodeQL	2026-02-05 (CLI: 2.24.1)	No; proprietary	—	C, C++, C#	Java, Kotlin	JavaScript, TypeScript	.NET	Python	Swift, Go, Ruby, Rust	Code search tool, focus on finding software bugs; search patterns written in query language that can search the AST and graphs (CFG, DFG, etc.) of supported languages; plugin available for Visual Studio Code
ConQAT (retired)	2015-02-01	Yes; ASL 2	Ada	C#, C++	Java	JavaScript	—	—	ABAP	Continuous quality assessment toolkit; allows flexible configuration of quality analyses (architecture conformance, clone detection, quality metrics, etc.) and dashboards
Coverity	2023-04-29 (2022.12)	No; proprietary	—	C, C++, C#, Objective-C	Java	JavaScript, TypeScript	—	Python	Ruby, PHP	Multi-language tool for security and quality issues; supports compliance standards (MISRA, ISO 26262 and others); free use for open-source projects
ECLAIR	2025-05-12 (3.14.0)	No; proprietary	—	C, C++	—	—	—	—	—	Multi-language tool for software verification. Applications range from coding rule validation, to automatic generation of testcases, to the proof of absence of run-time errors or generation of counterexamples, and to the specification of code matchers and rewriters based both syntactic and semantic conditions. Supports compliance standards (MISRA, Embedded C Coding Standard and others).
CPAchecker	2022-01-24 (2.1.1)	Yes; ASL 2	—	C	—	—	—	—	—	Configurable software verification tool for execution path checking of C
Cppcheck	2025-02-23 (2.17)	Partly; framework is GPL v3, with some proprietary features	—	C, C++	—	—	—	—	—	Open-source tool; checks for several types of errors, including use of STL; MISRA support being added
Cppdepend	2023-03-01 (2023.1)	No; proprietary	—	C, C++	—	—	—	—	—	Simplifies managing a complex C/C++ code base by analyzing and visualizing code dependencies, by defining design rules, by doing impact analysis, and comparing different versions of the code.
Cpplint	2020-07-29	Yes; CC-BY-3.0	—	C++	—	—	—	—	—	Open-source tool; checks compliance with C++ coding Google style guide
Fluctuat	2001	No; proprietary	Ada95	C	—	—	—	—	—	Abstract interpreter to validate program numerical properties
Fluid Attacks	2026-01-07	No; proprietary	—	C#	Java, Kotlin, Scala	JavaScript, TypeScript	—	Python	PHP, Dart, Go, HCL, HTML, JSON, Ruby, Swift, XML, YAML	SAST tool; supports many programming languages and frameworks; based on graph algorithms using Tree-sitter, can be integrated into CI/CD pipelines from providers supporting Docker
Frama-C	2022-06-21	Yes; LGPL v2.1, BSD, QPL	—	C	—	—	—	—	—	Open-source extensible analysis framework for C with several analyzers and a specification language common to all; includes analyses based on abstract interpretation, deductive verification, runtime monitoring
AdaCore CodeSonar	2020-06-01 (5.3)	No; proprietary	—	C, C++, Objective-C	Java	—	—	—	—	Defect detection (buffer overruns, memory leaks, etc.), concurrency and security checks, architecture visualizing, software metrics
GCC	2023-4-26 (13.1)	Yes; GPLv3+ with GCC Runtime Library Exception	—	C	—	—	—	—	—	Compiling with -fanalyzer flag (available from GCC 10) enables the static analyzer functionality
HCL Security AppScan Source	2020-12-01 (10.0.3)	No; proprietary	—	C, C++	Java, JSP	JavaScript	.NET	Python	ColdFusion, ASP, PHP, Perl, Visual Basic 6, PL/SQL, T-SQL, COBOL	Analyzes source code to identify security vulnerabilities while integrating security testing with software development processes and systems
Helix QAC	2023-04 (2023.1)	No; proprietary	—	C, C++	—	—	—	—	—	Formerly PRQA QA·C and QA·C++, deep static analysis of C/C++ for quality assurance and guideline/coding standard enforcement with MISRA support
Infer Static Analyzer	2026-05-12 (1.3.0)	Yes; MIT	—	C, C++, Objective-C	Java	—	—	—	—	Targets null pointer problems, leaks, concurrency issues and API usage for Facebook's mobile apps, available as open source on GitHub; sometimes called Facebook Infer
Imagix 4D	2020-10-01 (10.1.0)	No; proprietary	—	C, C++	Java	—	—	—	—	Windows and Linux versions
Kiuwan	2020-07-22	No; proprietary	—	C, C++, C#, Objective-C	Java, JSP	JavaScript	VB.NET	—	ABAP, COBOL, PHP, PL/SQL, T-SQL, SQL, Visual Basic, Android	Software Analytics end-to-end platform for static code analysis and automated code review; covers defect detection, application security & IT risk management, with enhanced life cycle and application governance features; supports over 20 languages
Klocwork	2023-04-04 (2023.1)	No; proprietary	—	C, C++, C#	Java	JavaScript	—	Python	Kotlin	Provides security vulnerability, standards compliance (MISRA, ISO 26262 and others), defect detection and build-over-build trend analysis
Lint	1978-07-26	Yes; permissive BSD-like	—	C	—	—	—	—	—	The original, from 1978, static code analyzer for C
MALPAS		No; proprietary	Ada	C	—	—	—	—	Pascal, Assembler (Intel, PowerPC and Motorola)	Software static analysis toolset for many languages; main use is for safety criticality in nuclear and aerospace industries
Moose	2021-01-21 (7.0.3)	Yes; MIT	—	C, C++	Java	—	.NET	—	Smalltalk	Begun as software analysis platform with many tools to manipulate, assess or visualize software; evolving to a more generic data analysis platform
NDepend	2022-03-16 (2022.1)	No; proprietary	—	C#	—	—	VB.NET .NET	—	—	Simplifies managing a complex .NET code base by analyzing and visualizing code dependencies, by defining design rules, doing impact analysis, comparing different versions; integrates into Visual Studio
.NET Compiler Platform (Roslyn)	2020-12-08 (3.8.0)	Yes; MIT	—	C#	—	—	VB.NET	—	—	Open-source compiler framework for C# and Visual Basic (.NET) developed by Microsoft .NET, provides an API to analyze and manipulate syntax; FxCop rules were implemented into Roslyn
Parasoft C/C++test	2024-12-03 (2024.2)	No; proprietary	—	C, C++	—	—	—	—	—	C/C++ tool with AI; does static analysis, unit tests, code review, runtime error detecting, enforcing safety and security standards; plugins available for Visual Studio, Visual Studio Code, Eclipse-based IDEs, and GitHub integrating
Parasoft Jtest	2024-12-03 (2024.2)	No; proprietary	—	—	Java	—	—	—	—	Java tool with AI; does static analysis, unit tests, enforces safety and security standards; plugins available for IntelliJ IDEA, Visual Studio Code and Eclipse-based IDEs, GitHub integration
PC-lint Plus	2022-08-02 (2.0 Beta 2)	No; proprietary	—	C, C++	—	—	—	—	—	Static analysis tool used to detect wide range of defects, identify suspicious code, enforce various coding standards (MISRA/AUTOSAR/etc), calculate and report complex metrics, and implement user-defined checks
PMD	2025-11-28 (7.19.0)	Yes; BSD-like	—	C, C++	Java, Kotlin, Scala, JSP, Apache Velocity Template Language (VTL)	JavaScript	—	—	Apex, ColdFusion, HTML, PHP, PLSQL, Swift, Visualforce, XML, Maven POM, WSDL, XSL	Duplicate code detector
Polyspace	2022-09-15	No; proprietary	Ada	C, C++	—	—	—	—	—	Uses abstract interpretation to detect and prove absence of some runtime errors and dead code in source code; used to check all MISRA (2004, 2012) rules (directives, non directives)
Pretty Diff	2019-04-21 (101.0.0)	Yes; CC0	—	—	—	JavaScript, TypeScript	—	—	Markup, script and style languages (like XML, CSS)	Language-specific code comparing tool; features analysis reporting, minification, and beautification algorithms
PVS-Studio	2024-08-16 (7.32)	No; proprietary	—	C, C++, C++/CLI, C++/CX, C#	Java	—	—	—	—	Software analysis tool
Qodana	2023-07-23 (2023.2)	No; proprietary	—	C#	Java, Kotlin	JavaScript, TypeScript	VB.NET	Python	Go, HTML, PHP, CSS, Android, Vue.js	Code quality analysis tool; uses static code analysis
RIPS	2020-02-17 (3.4)	No; proprietary	—	—	Java	—	—	—	PHP	Static code analysis tool with many integration options for automated detection of complex security vulnerabilities
Semgrep	2026-10-02 (1.179.0)	Yes; LGPL v2.1	—	—	Java	JavaScript, TypeScript	—	Python	Go, JSON, PHP, Ruby, language-agnostic mode	Static analysis tool; helps expressing code standards and surfacing bugs early; experimental support for 11 other languages; CI service and rule library available
Sider	2021-02-02	No; proprietary	—	—	—	JavaScript, CoffeeScript	—	Python	Ruby, PHP, Go	Static code analysis based automated code review tool working on GitHub and GitLab; checks style, quality, dependencies, security and bugs; integrates several open source static analysis tools
SLAM project	2010-07-14	No; proprietary	—	C	—	—	—	—	—	Microsoft Research project for checking that software (drivers) satisfies critical behavioral properties of interfaces it uses
SofCheck Inspector, Codepeer	2020-08-24 (21.x)	No; proprietary	Ada	—	Java	—	—	—	—	Static detection of logic errors, race conditions, redundant code; automatically extracts pre-postconditions from code
SonarQube	2024-02-05 (10.4)	Partly; framework is LGPL v3.0, but some features can be proprietary	—	C, C#, C++, Objective-C	Java, Kotlin, Scala	JavaScript, TypeScript	VB.NET	Python	ABAP, Apex, CSS, COBOL, Flex, Go, HTML, PHP, PLI, PL/SQL, Ruby, Swift, TSQL, Visual Basic 6, XML	Continuous inspection engine that finds vulnerabilities, bugs, code smells, and tracks code complexity, unit test coverage, duplication; offers branch analysis and C, C++, Objective-C support via commercial licenses
SourceMeter	2016-12-16 (8.2)	No; proprietary	—	C, C++	Java	—	—	Python	RPG IV (AS/400)	Cross-platform, command-line static source code analyzer; integrates with PMD and SpotBugs
Sourcetrail (retired)	2021-04 (2021.4.19)	Yes; GPL	—	C, C++	Java	—	—	Python	Perl	Open-source source code explorer; provides interactive dependency graphs, supports several programming languages
Sparse	2021-09-06 (0.6.4)	Yes; MIT	—	C	—	—	—	—	GCC extensions	Open-source tool designed to find faults in Linux kernel
Splint	2007-07-12 (3.1.2)	Yes; GPLv2	—	C	—	—	—	—	—	Open-source tool statically checking C programs for security vulnerabilities and coding errors
StyleCop	2016-05-02 (2016.1.0)	Yes; Ms-PL	—	C#	—	—	.NET	—	—	Analyzes C# source code to enforce a set of style and consistency rules; can be run from inside of Visual Studio or integrated into an MSBuild project
Squore	2020-11-27 (20.1)	No; proprietary	Ada	C, C++, C#, Objective-C	Java	JavaScript, TypeScript	VB.NET	Python	Fortran, PHP, PL/SQL, Swift, T-SQL, XAML	Multi-purpose and multi-language monitoring tool for software projects; integrates with other scanners
Understand	2023-01-19 (6.3)	No; proprietary	Ada	C, C++, C#, Objective-C	Java	JavaScript	—	Python	FORTRAN, Jovial, Pascal, VHDL, HTML, PHP, XML	Multi-platform tool for code analysis and comprehension of large code bases; recognizes many dialects of C, C++, C# like ANSI, K&R and Objective-C++
Visual Expert	2021-09-10	No; proprietary	—	—	—	—	—	—	PowerBuilder, Oracle PL/SQL, SQL Server Transact-SQL (T-SQL)	Continuous code inspecting, reports on quality and security issues, helps understand complex code (cross-references, source code documenting and comparing, code performance analysis)
Visual Studio	2021-10-12 (16.11)	No; proprietary	—	C, C++, C#	—	—	—	—	VB.NET	IDE; provides static code analysis for C/C++ in editor environment and from compiler command line; includes .NET Compiler Platform (Roslyn) which provides C# and VB.NET analysis
Yasca (retired)	2010-11-01 (2.21)	Yes; multiple licenses	—	C, C++	Java	JavaScript	—	—	ASP, PHP, HTML, CSS, ColdFusion, COBOL	Yet Another Source Code Analyzer; plugin-based framework to scan arbitrary file types, with plugins; integrates with other scanners, including FindBugs, PMD, Pixy
Tool	Release	Free software	Languages supported							Notes

== Languages ==
=== Ada ===
- CodePeer
- ConQAT
- Fluctuat
- LDRA Testbed
- MALPAS
- Polyspace
- SofCheck Inspector
- Squore
- Understand

=== C, C++ ===
- Astree
- Axivion Suite (Bauhaus)
- BLAST
- Clang
- Coccinelle
- Coverity
- CPAchecker
- Cppcheck
- Cppdepend
- Cpplint
- ECLAIR
- Eclipse
- Fluctuat
- Frama-C
- GCC
- Helix QAC
- Facebook Infer
- Klocwork
- Lint
- LDRA Testbed
- Parasoft C/C++test
- PC-lint Plus
- Polyspace
- PVS-Studio
- SLAM project
- Sparse
- SonarQube
- Splint
- Understand
- Visual Studio

=== C# ===
- Axivion Suite (Bauhaus)
- Code Dx
- CodeScene
- CodeQL
- Coverity
- Fluid Attacks
- Kiuwan
- Klocwork
- .NET Compiler Platform
- PVS-Studio
- SonarQube
- Sotoarc
- StyleCop
- Squore
- Understand
- Visual Studio

=== IEC 61131-3 ===
- CODESYS Static Analysis – integrated add-on for CODESYS (application code realized e.g. in ST, FBD, LD)

=== Java ===
Tool	Latest release	Free software	Duplicate code	Notes
Checkstyle	2020-01-26	Yes; LGPL	No	Besides some static code analysis, it can be used to show violations of a configured coding standard. Duplicate code detection was removed from Checkstyle.
Eclipse	2017-06-28	Yes; EPL	No	Cross-platform IDE with own set of several hundred code inspections available for analyzing code on-the-fly in the editor and bulk analysis of the whole project. Plugins for Checkstyle, FindBugs, and PMD.
FindBugs	2015-03-06	Yes; LGPL		Based on Jakarta BCEL from the University of Maryland. SpotBugs is the spiritual successor of FindBugs, carrying on from the point where it left off with support of its community.
IntelliJ IDEA	2021-04-06	Yes; ASL 2	Yes	A leading Java IDE with built-in code inspection and analysis. Plugins for Checkstyle, FindBugs, and PMD.
JArchitect	2017-06-11	No; proprietary		Simplifies managing a complex code base by analyzing and visualizing code dependencies, defining design rules, doing impact analysis, and by comparing different versions of the code.
Jtest	2024-11-01 (2024.2)	No; proprietary	Yes	Testing and static code analysis product by Parasoft.
Soot	2020-10-28	Yes; LGPL		A language manipulation and optimization framework consisting of intermediate languages.
PMD	2025-11-28	Yes; BSD License	Yes	Static code analyzer with support for plugins, including CPD. PMD supports checking of several languages.
Squale	2011-05-26	Yes; LGPL		A platform to manage software quality.
ThreadSafe	2014-03-28	No; proprietary		A static analysis tool focused on finding concurrency bugs.

- Coverity
- Facebook Infer
- Fluid Attacks
- Klocwork
- LDRA Testbed
- PMD
- RIPS
- Semgrep
- SourceMeter
- Understand

=== JavaScript ===
- ESLint – JavaScript syntax checker and formatter.
- Google's Closure Compiler – JavaScript optimizer that rewrites code to be faster and smaller, and checks use of native JavaScript functions.
- CodeScene – Behavioral analysis of code.
- Fluid Attacks
- JSHint – A community driven fork of JSLint.
- JSLint – JavaScript syntax checker and validator.
- Klocwork
- Semgrep – A static analysis tool that helps expressing code standards and surfacing bugs early. A CI service and a rule library is also available.
- Understand

=== Objective-C, Objective-C++ ===
- Clang – The free Clang project includes a static analyzer. As of version 3.2, this analyzer is included in Xcode.
- Infer – Developed by an engineering team at Facebook with open-source contributors. Targets null pointers, leaks, API usage and other lint checks. Available as open source on github.
- Understand

=== Opa ===
- Opa includes its own static analyzer. As the language is intended for web application development, the strongly statically typed compiler checks the validity of high-level types for web data, and prevents by default many vulnerabilities such as XSS attacks and database code injections.

=== Packaging ===
- Lintian – Checks Debian software packages for common inconsistencies and errors.
- Rpmlint – Checks for common problems in rpm packages.

=== Perl ===
- Perl::Critic – A tool to help enforce common Perl best practices. Most best practices are based on Damian Conway's Perl Best Practices book.
- PerlTidy – Program that acts as a syntax checker and tester/enforcer for coding practices in Perl.
- Padre – An IDE for Perl that also provides static code analysis to check for common beginner errors.

=== PL/SQL ===
- TOAD – A PL/SQL development environment with a Code xPert component that reports on general code efficiency as well as specific programming issues.
- Visual Expert – A PL/SQL code analysis tool that reports on programming issues and helps understand and maintain complex code (Impact Analysis, Source Code documentation, Call trees, CRUD matrix, etc.).

=== PowerBuilder, PowerScript ===
- Visual Expert – A tool scanning PowerBuilder libraries (PBLs) for code inspection, Impact Analysis, Source Code documentation, Call trees, CRUD matrix.

=== Python ===
- PyCharm – Cross-platform Python IDE with code inspections available for analyzing code on-the-fly in the editor and bulk analysis of the whole project.
- PyDev – Eclipse-based Python IDE with code analysis available on-the-fly in the editor or at save time.
- Pylint – Static code analyzer. Quite stringent; includes many stylistic warnings as well.
- Fluid Attacks
- Klocwork
- Semgrep – Static code analyzer that helps expressing code standards and surfacing bugs early. A CI service and a rule library is also available.
- Understand

=== Transact-SQL ===
- Visual Expert – A SQLServer code analysis tool that reports on programming issues and helps understand and maintain complex code (Impact Analysis, source code documentation, call trees, CRUD matrix, etc.).

== Tools with duplicate code detection ==
- Axivion Suite (Bauhaus)
- Code Dx
- CodeScene
- PMD
- SofCheck Inspector
- SonarQube
- SourceMeter
- Understand

== Formal methods tools ==
Tools that use sound, i.e. over-approximating a rigorous model, formal methods approach to static analysis (e.g., using static program assertions). Sound methods contain no false negatives for bug-free programs, at least with regards to the idealized mathematical model they are based on (there is no "unconditional" soundness). Note that there is no guarantee they will report all bugs for buggy programs, they will report at least one.

- Astrée – finds all potential runtime errors by abstract interpretation, can prove the absence of runtime errors and can prove functional assertions; tailored towards safety-critical C code (e.g. avionics).
- CodePeer – Statically determines and documents pre- and post-conditions for Ada subprograms; statically checks preconditions at all call sites.
- ECLAIR – Uses formal methods-based static code analysis techniques such as abstract interpretation and model checking combined with constraint satisfaction techniques to detect or prove the absence of certain run time errors in source code.
- ESC/Java and ESC/Java2 – Based on Java Modeling Language, an enriched version of Java
- Frama-C – An open-source analysis framework for C, based on the ANSI/ISO C Specification Language (ACSL). Its main techniques include abstract interpretation, deductive verification and runtime monitoring.
- KeY – analysis platform for Java based on theorem proving with specifications in the Java Modeling Language; can generate test cases as counterexamples; stand-alone GUI or Eclipse integration
- MALPAS – A formal methods tool that uses directed graphs and regular algebra to prove that software under analysis correctly meets its mathematical specification.
- Polyspace – Uses abstract interpretation, a formal methods based technique, to detect and prove the absence of certain run time errors in source code for C/C++, and Ada
- SPARK Toolset including the SPARK Examiner – Based on the SPARK language, a subset of Ada.

== See also ==
- Automated code review
- Best Coding Practices
- List of software development philosophies
- Dynamic program analysis
- Software metrics
- Integrated development environment (IDE) and comparison of integrated development environments. IDEs will usually come with built-in support for static program analysis, or with an option to integrate such support. Eclipse offers such integration mechanism for most different types of extensions (plug-ins).
