= SQuORE =

SQUORE
- Original author(s): Squoring Technologies
- Developer(s): Vector Informatik
- Stable release: 2018 / April 7, 2018; 6 years ago
- Operating system: Cross-platform
- Type: software analytics; static code analysis
- License: Proprietary
- Website: www.squoring.com/en/produits/squore-software-analytics/

SQUORE is a software analytics and static code analysis tool for software projects. It gathers information from different artefacts types (e.g. source code, test results, bug tracking system) and tools (reads outputs of Checkstyle, PMD, FindBugs, Polyspace, Coverity or SonarQube) and publishes a summarised view of the project quality or progress.

The quality model used for analysis is fully customisable, and many different quality models have been implemented: SQALE, ISO9126 maintainability, European Cooperation for Space Standardization or HIS Automotive group. It is used in the industry and academic research for software engineering and data mining related concerns.

== History ==
Squore was initially developed by Squoring Technologies, a French software editor founded in 2010 in Toulouse and specialized in the evaluation and monitoring of software and systems development projects..

In June 2018, Vector Informatik acquired Squoring Technologies and is now the owner of the Squore tool.

== Common uses ==
The main goal of Squore's software analysis is the assessment of quality characteristics like maintainability, reliability or maturity. Software quality is subject to many definitions and debates; hence evaluation, sub-characteristics and metrics used will differ depending on the context of the analysis: e.g. critical flight systems, medical devices, desktop products.

Contract management may rely on code analysis to define levels of quality between contractors: e.g. cloning ratio, complexity of functions, specific ratings. By using such constraints stakeholders may accept or refuse a delivery based on the analysis result of the product.

== See also ==
- SQALE
- Static code analysis
- List of tools for static code analysis
