= Sider =

Sider is the surname of several people:

- Ron Sider (born 17 September 1939), Canadian-born American theologian and social activist.
- Theodore Sider ("Ted"), American philosopher specializing in metaphysics and philosophy of language.
- Lizzie Sider (born 1997 or 1998) (Elizabeth Sophia Sider), American singer-songwriter.
- Gerald Sider, anthropologist.
- Sider, an automated code review service.

== See also ==
- North Sider, (foaled in 1982), American thoroughbred racehorse.
