= PC-Lint =

Commercial software linting tool for C/C++ languages

- Developer: Gimpel Software
- Operating system: Microsoft Windows & OS/2
- Type: static code analysis of C/C++ code
- Website: pclintplus.com

PC-lint is a commercial software linting tool produced by Gimpel Software for the C/C++ languages.

PC-lint is a command-line tool for performing static code analysis, indicating suspicious or plain wrong issues in source code. PC-lint can be integrated into IDEs as an external tool, and the format of the warning messages can be adapted to the form the IDE is able to recognize and process. It is advertised as running on Microsoft Windows and OS/2. A separate multi-platform version called FlexeLint is also available for Unix and other platforms, albeit at substantially greater cost.

PC-lint can be used for quality assurance of C or C++ source code and checking the code for conformance to coding guidelines such as MISRA C or MISRA C++. It also includes checks for problems unique to parallel programs built on POSIX threads.

== Post processing ==
The output of PC-lint can be used by additional tools to generate reports and to present the warnings in a more accessible form.

The ALOA engine was originally released for free by Ralf Holly and now resides at GitHub, providing regression reporting comparing multiple runs of lints.

Visual Lint provides IDE integration as well as help to understand PC-lint messages and customizable reports of the lint warnings.

Linticator integrates PC-lint into the Eclipse C/C++ Development Tooling to provide live feedback in the editor and to generate configuration files and suppression markers for PC-lint.

== See also ==
- List of tools for static code analysis
