= CodePeer =

Static analysis tool

CodePeer is a static analysis tool, which identifies constructs that are likely to lead to run-time errors such as buffer overflows, and it flags legal but suspect code, typical of logic errors in Ada programs. All Ada run-time checks are exhaustively verified by CodePeer, using a variant of abstract interpretation. In October 2014, CodePeer was qualified for use in safety-critical contexts as a sound tool for identifying possible run-time errors. CodePeer also produces detailed as-built documentation of each subprogram, including pre- and post-conditions, to help with code review and to ease locating potential bugs and vulnerabilities early.

CodePeer is produced by AdaCore, a computer software company with North American headquarters in New York City and European headquarters in Paris.

== See also ==
- Abstract interpretation
- Static code analysis
- Software testing
- Software Security Assurance
- List of tools for static code analysis
