= SofCheck Inspector =

The SofCheck Inspector is a static analysis tool for Java and Ada. It statically determines and documents the pre- and postconditions of Java methods or Ada subprograms, and uses that information to identify logic flaws, race conditions, and redundant code in an individual Java class or Ada package, a subsystem, or a complete program. The SofCheck Inspector is produced by SofCheck, Inc., a software product company in Burlington, Massachusetts.

The SofCheck Inspector static analysis engine is used within the CodePeer static analysis product from AdaCore.

== See also ==
- Static code analysis
- Software testing
- Software Security Assurance
- List of tools for static code analysis
