= Cpplint =

Open source lint-like tool developed by Google

cpplint
- Developer: Google
- Written in: Python
- Type: Static program analysis tool
- License: 3-clause BSD license
- Website: google.github.io/styleguide/
- Repository: github.com/google/styleguide

cpplint or cpplint.py is an open source lint-like tool developed by Google, designed to ensure that C++ code conforms to Google's coding style guides.

Therefore, cpplint implements what Google considers best practices in C++ coding. The script cpplint.py reads source code files and flags deviations from the style guide. It also identifies syntax errors. It is rules based, and uses a number of heuristics to identify bad code.

Cpplint is not perfect, as it can suffer from occasional false positives and negatives. Nevertheless, it is still a very useful tool for style enforcement.

Moreover, rules can be fine-grained selected using the options --verbose and --filter. Line length rule can be configured with option --linelength and file extensions can be configured with --extensions (by default: 'h', 'cpp', 'cc', 'cu' and 'cuh'). Some options can be stored in a configuration file CPPLINT.cfg.

cpplint is implemented as a Python script. It is distributed under the 3 clause BSD license.

== See also ==
- Google C++ style guide
- cpplint on GitHub
- cpplint on PyPI
