= NDepend =

- Developer(s): NDepend
- Stable release: 2025.1
- Operating system: Windows
- Type: Software quality
- License: Commercial, Proprietary
- Website: ndepend.com

NDepend is a static analysis tool for C# and .NET code to manage code quality and security. The tool proposes a large number of features, from CI/CD Web Reporting to Quality Gate and Dependencies Visualization. For that reason, the community refers to it as the "Swiss Army Knife" for .NET Developers.

== Features ==
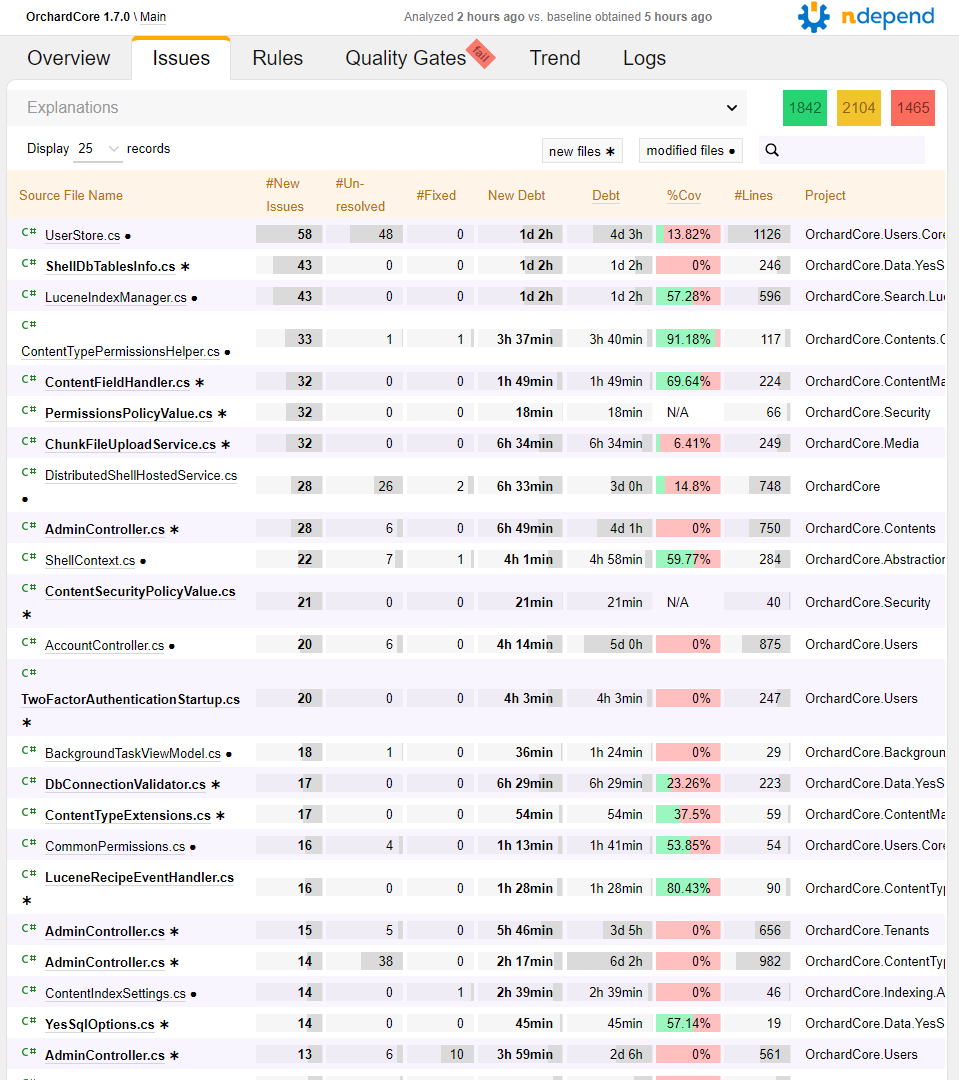
NDepend Report Source Files List

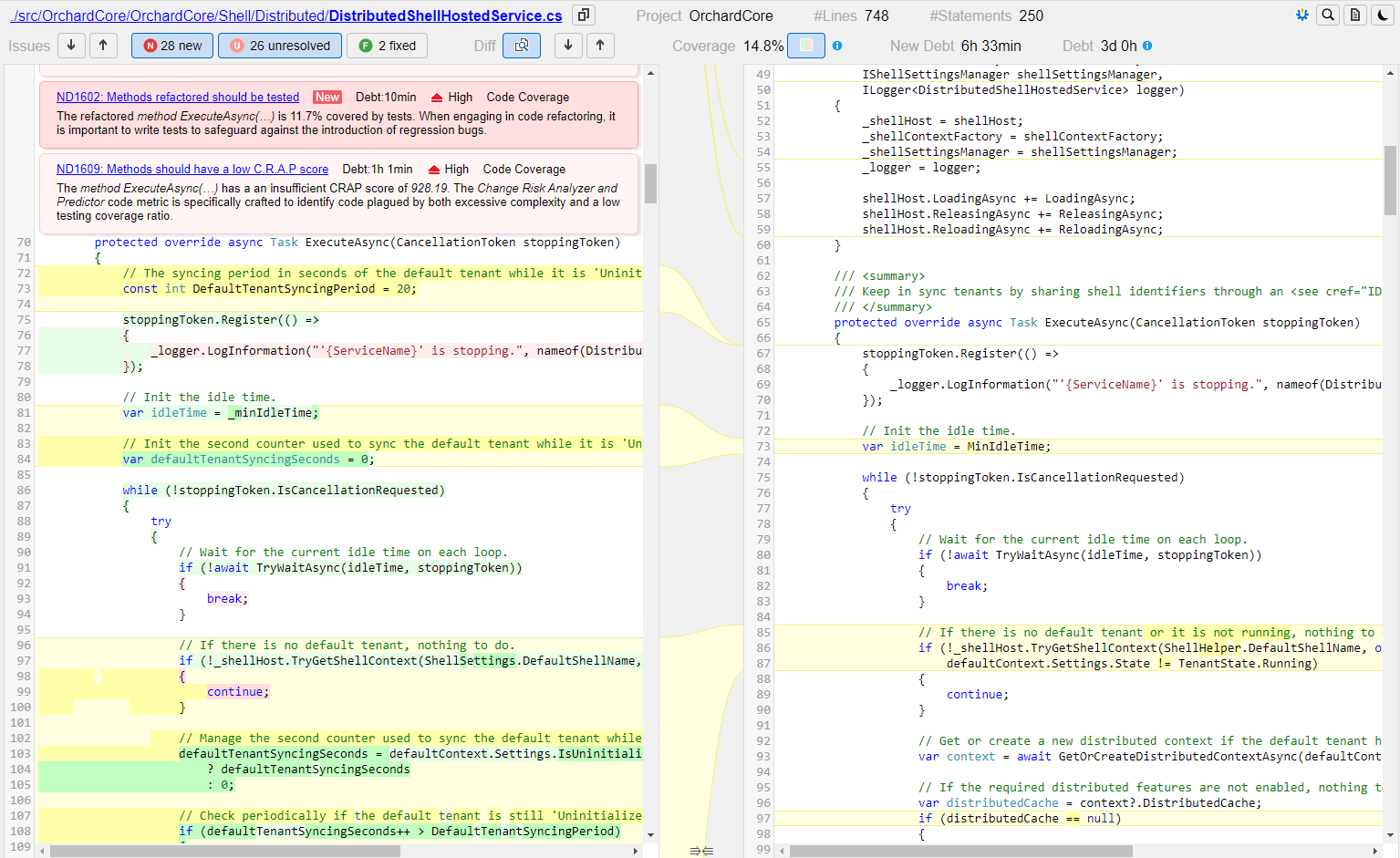

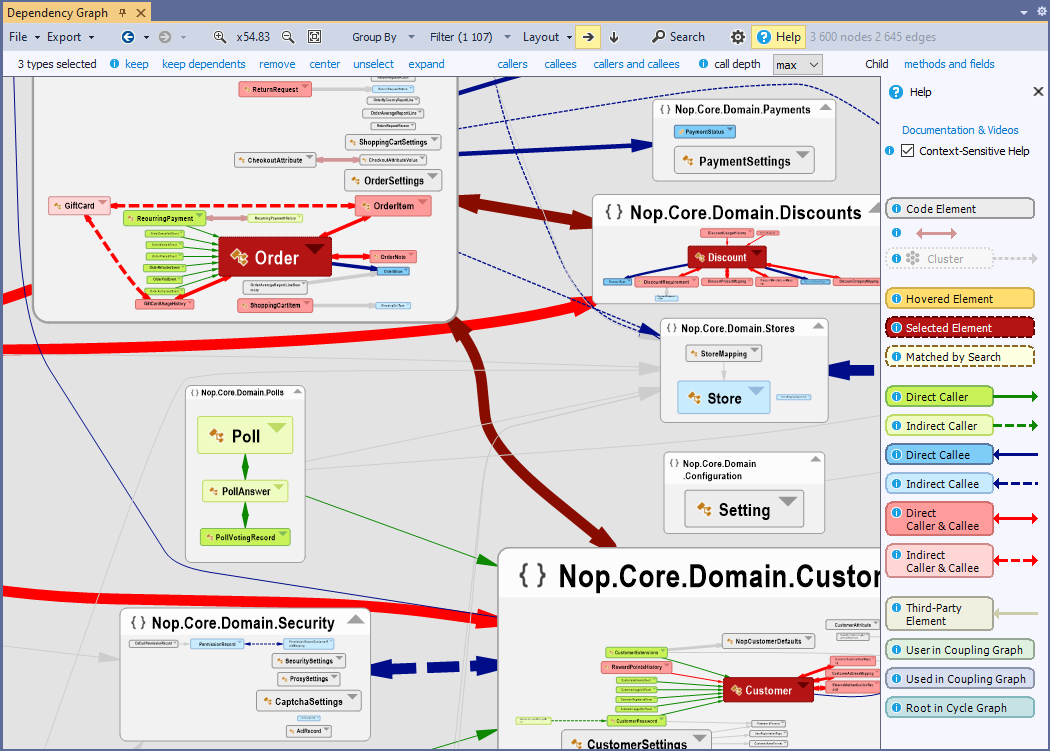

The main features of NDepend are:

- Interactive Web Reports about all Aspects of .NET Code Quality and Security Sample Reports Here. Reports can be built on any platform: Windows, Linux and MacOS
- [Roslyn Analyzers Issues Import https://www.ndepend.com/docs/reporting-roslyn-analyzers-issues]
- Quality Gates
- CI/CD Integration with Azure DevOps, GitHub Action, Bamboo, Jenkins, TeamCity, AppVeyor
- Dependency Visualization (using dependency graphs, and dependency matrix)
- Smart Technical Debt Estimation
- Declarative code rule over C# LINQ query (CQLinq).
- Software Metrics (NDepend currently supports more than 100 code metrics: Cyclomatic complexity; Afferent and Efferent Coupling; Relational Cohesion; Google page rank of .NET types; Percentage of code covered by tests, etc.)
- Code Coverage data import from Visual Studio coverage, dotCover, OpenCover, NCover, NCrunch.
- All results are compared against a baseline allowing the user to focus on newly identified issues.
- Integration with Visual Studio 2022, 2019, 2017, 2015, 2013, 2012, 2010, or can run as a standalone through VisualNDepend.exe, side by side with JetBrains Rider or Visual Studio Code.

== Code rules through LINQ queries (CQLinq) ==
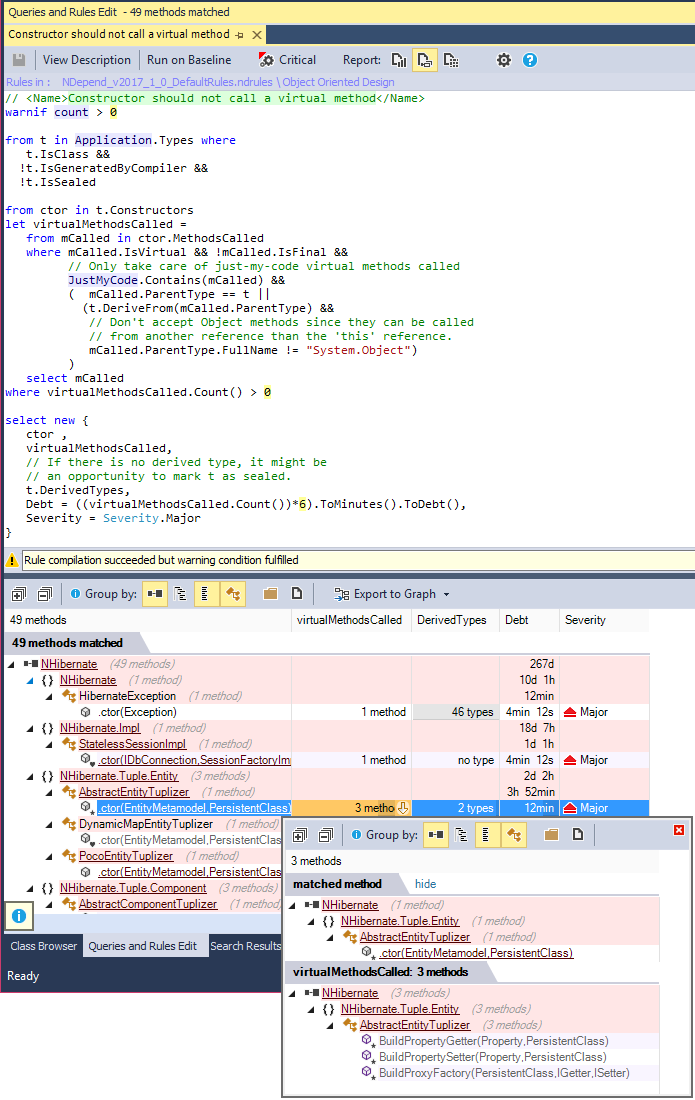

Live code queries and code rules through LINQ queries is the backbone of NDepend, all features use it extensively. Here are some sample code queries:

- Base class should not use derivatives:

 // <Name>Base class should not use derivatives</Name>
 warnif count > 0 
 from baseClass in JustMyCodeTypes
 where baseClass.IsClass && baseClass.NbChildren > 0 // <-- for optimization!
 let derivedClassesUsed = baseClass.DerivedTypes.UsedBy(baseClass)
 where derivedClassesUsed.Count() > 0
 select new { baseClass, derivedClassesUsed }

- Avoid making complex methods even more complex (source code cyclomatic complexity):

 // <Name>Avoid making complex methods even more complex (source code cyclomatic complexity)</Name>
 warnif count > 0 
 from m in JustMyCodeMethods where
  !m.IsAbstract &&
   m.IsPresentInBothBuilds() &&
   m.CodeWasChanged()
 let oldCC = m.OlderVersion().CyclomaticComplexity
 where oldCC > 6 && m.CyclomaticComplexity > oldCC 
 select new { m,
     oldCC, 
     newCC = m.CyclomaticComplexity, 
     oldLoc = m.OlderVersion().NbLinesOfCode,
     newLoc = m.NbLinesOfCode,
 }

Additionally, the tool provides a live CQLinq query editor with code completion and embedded documentation.

== See also ==
- Design Structure Matrix
- List of tools for static code analysis
- Software visualization
