= William Pugh (computer scientist) =

American computer scientist (born 1960)

Bill Pugh
- Born: June 14, 1960 (age 66)
- Education: Cornell University
- Known for: Skiplist, FindBugs
- Scientific career
- Fields: Computer Science, Software Engineering
- Workplaces: University of Maryland, College Park
- Thesis: Incremental computation and the incremental evaluation of functional programs (1988)
- Doctoral advisor: Ray "Tim" Teitelbaum
- Website: www.cs.umd.edu/~pugh/

William Worthington Pugh Jr. (born 1960) is an American computer scientist who invented the skip list and the Omega test for deciding Presburger arithmetic. He was the co-author of the static code analysis tool FindBugs, and was highly influential in the development of the current memory model of the Java language. Pugh received a Ph.D. in computer science, with a minor in acting, from Cornell University. His thesis advisor was Tim Teitelbaum.

In 2012 he became professor emeritus of the University of Maryland's department of computer science in College Park. He is on the technical advisory board for the static analysis company Fortify Software.
