= Aikido Security =

Cyber security company

- Type: Private
- Industry: Cybersecurity
- Founded: October 26, 2022
- Founders: Willem Delbare; Roeland Delrue; Felix Garriau; Madeline Lawrence
- Headquarters: Ghent, Belgium
- Website: www.aikido.dev

Aikido Security BV is a cybersecurity company based in Ghent, Belgium and founded in 2022. The company develops application security software.

== History ==
Aikido Security was incorporated on 26 October 2022 in Ghent by Willem Delbare, Roeland Delrue, Felix Garriau, and Madeline Lawrence. The company's name refers to the Japanese martial art aikido. In January 2023, the company raised €2 million in pre-seed funding. In November 2023, it raised €5 million in a seed funding round co-led by Notion Capital and Connect Ventures.

In May 2024, the company raised $17 million in a Series A funding round led by Singular. In January 2025, Aikido Security co-launched Opengrep, an open-source fork of Semgrep. In August 2025, the company acquired the artificial intelligence (AI) code review startup Trag.

In September 2025, it acquired Allseek and Haicker. In the same month, Aikido Security researchers reported malicious code in npm packages during a supply chain attack.

On 14 January 2026, the company raised a $60 million Series B at a $1 billion valuation. In March 2026, Zach Rice, the creator of Gitleaks, joined Aikido Security and started the open-source project Betterleaks.

== Products and activities ==
Aikido Security develops application security software that includes code scanning, dependency analysis, cloud security, and runtime protection.

In 2025, following the acquisitions of Allseek and Haicker, the company introduced automated penetration testing under the name “Aikido Attack”.

== Organization ==
The company is headquartered in Ghent, Belgium, and has offices in San Francisco, London, and Chicago.

== See also ==
- Cybersecurity
- Application security
- DevSecOps
- Semgrep
