= Threadsafe =

Threadsafe may refer to:

- Thread safety, a computer programming concept applicable to multi-threaded programs
- ThreadSafe, a source code analysis tool for detecting Java concurrency defects
