= PVS =

The initialism PVS may refer to:

== Organization ==
- Polynesian Voyaging Society, a research and educational corporation in Hawaii
- Prisoner Visitation and Support, US non-profit organization
- Project Vote Smart, a US research organization
- Performance of Veterinary Services, an OIE capacity building platform for the sustainable improvement of national veterinary services
- Pojoaque Valley Schools

== Science ==
- Persistent vegetative state
- Plummer–Vinson syndrome, a rare disease
- Polyvinyl siloxane, an addition reaction silicone elastomer
- Potato virus S, a plant pathogenic virus
- Phantom vibration syndrome
- Penile vibratory stimulation, a means of inducing erection and ejaculation

== Technology ==
- Palmtex Portable Videogame System, a handheld videogame console
- Potentially visible set, a form of occlusion culling
- Principal variation search, a negamax algorithm
- Prototype Verification System, a specification language
- PVS-Studio, a static code analyzer for C, C++ and C#

== Other ==
- The IATA code for Provideniya Bay Airport
- PVS News, a satirical news channel on the BBC's programme Broken News
- AN/PVS-14, monocular night vision device
- Port Vila Shield, football tournament
