= Sider (Automated Code Review) =

Automated code review tool

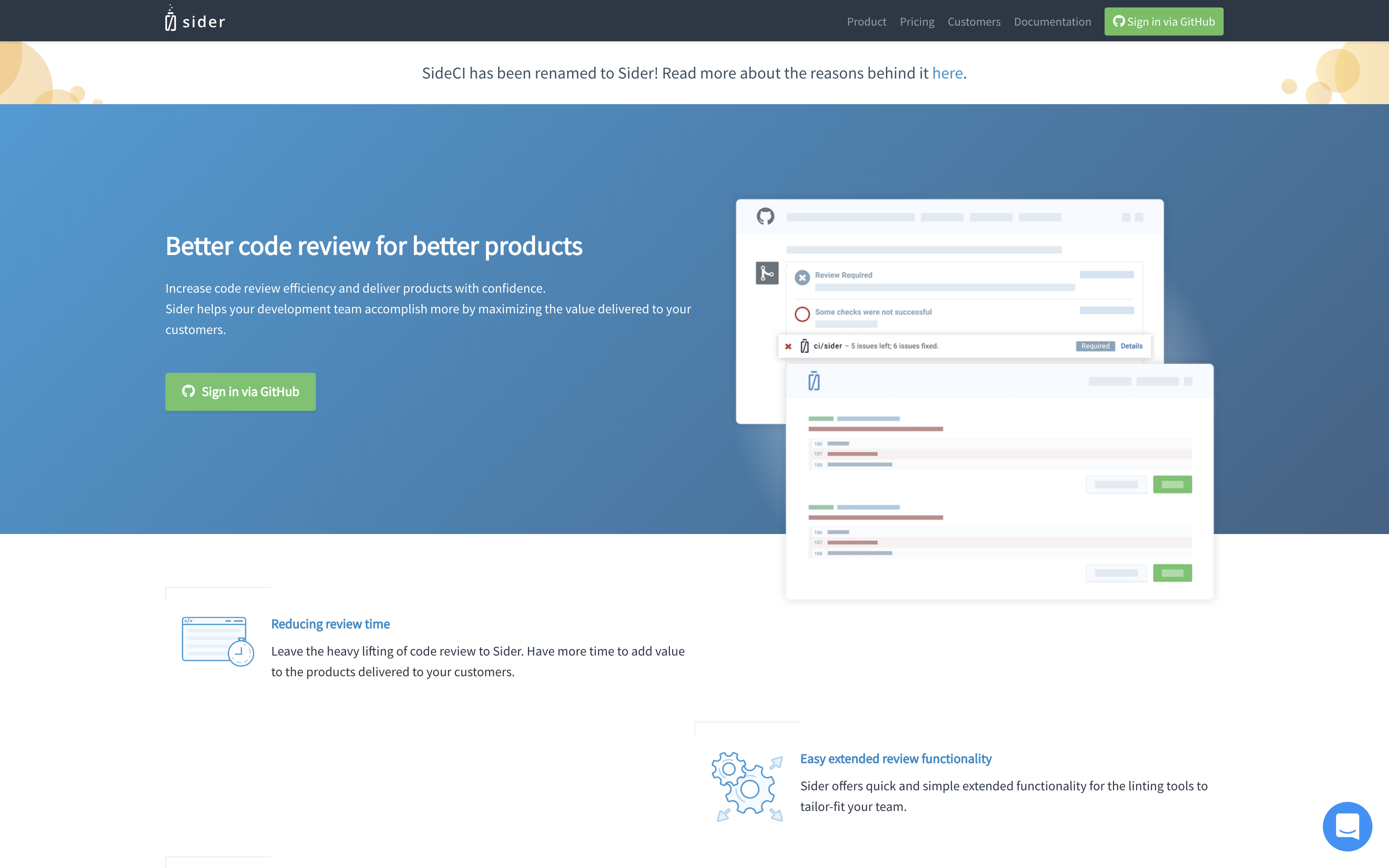
sider review

Sider is an automated code review tool with GitHub. It's based on static code analysis and integrates with a number of open source static analysis tools. It checks style violations, code quality, security and dependencies and provides results as a comment on GitHub pull request.

Sider was developed by Tokyo-based startup Actcat and launched in April 2014. It released technical debt kanban feature for Ruby in August 2016.

Sider changed service and company names from SideCI to Sider in June 2018.

Sider's business was transferred from Sider Inc. to Sleeek Corporation on October 31, 2019.

== Features ==
- Easy setup process. Sider can be set up in 30 seconds.
- Immediate feedback on Pull Requests. Sider automatically and immediately scans PRs for issues of style, complexity, duplication, and security. On using GitHub Pull Requests, it will point out any issues so that one can discuss and fix them before merging. Moreover, you do not have to change the flow of existing code review.
- Get Slack notification. Sider can be officially connected to Slack, which leads you to get notifications for each of your private or public projects. It will tell you whether there is something in need of attention.
- Sider is free for open source projects. It offers a limited free plan for private repositories.
- Every GitHub user can get a 14-day trial without charge.

== Supported languages ==
- Ruby
- PHP
- JavaScript
- TypeScript
- CSS
- Java
- Kotlin
- Go
- Python
- Swift
- C/C++
- C#
- Shell Script
- Dockerfile
- Markdown

== See also ==
- Automated code review
- Programming tools
- Code review
- List of tools for code review
- Static Analysis
- List of tools for static code analysis

== Awards ==
- Ruby biz Grand prix 2016 Special Prize
