= KFX =

KFX may refer to:

== Computing ==
- KFX (program), the kernel language of FX-87, a polymorphic typed functional language
- Kameleon FireEx KFX, a computational fluid dynamics simulation program focusing on gas dispersion and fire simulation.
- .kfx, a proprietary ebook format for the Amazon Kindle
- Kofax (stock ticker: KFX), process automation software provider

== Other uses ==
- Kullui (ISO 639 language code: kfx)
- KAI KF-X, a South Korean project for development of an indigenous fighter aircraft
- KFX, a series of ATVs, see List of Kawasaki motorcycles
- OMX Copenhagen 20, a stock market index for the Copenhagen Stock Exchange, formerly known as KFX

== See also ==
- KFXS radio station
- KF (disambiguation)
