= ECLAIR =

Software testing tool

- Developer: BUGSENG
- Stable release: 3.14.0 (2025) / May 12, 2025; 17 months ago
- Operating system: Cross-platform
- Type: Static code analysis
- License: Proprietary
- Website: bugseng.com/eclair-static-analysis-tool/

ECLAIR is a commercial static code analysis tool developed by BUGSENG for automatic analysis, verification, testing and transformation of C and C++ programs.

== Capabilities ==
ECLAIR is a complete re-engineering of a series of prototypes developed at the Applied Formal Methods Laboratory of the University of Parma. It uses formal methods-based static code analysis techniques such as abstract interpretation and model checking combined with constraint satisfaction techniques to detect or prove the absence of certain run time errors in source code, and provides support for program analysis and verification, program test generation and program transformation.

Concerning program analysis and verification, ECLAIR can statically detect or proof the absence of run-time anomalies as well as automatically check for conformance with respect to several coding standards, such as MISRA C, MISRA C++, CERT C Secure Coding Standard, CERT C++ Secure Coding Standard, High-Integrity C++, NASA/JPL C, ESA/BSSC C/C++, JSF C++, EC--, Netrino Embedded C, The Power of Ten (C), Industrial Strength C++.

For program testing, ECLAIR can automatically synthesize sets of unit test inputs that reach a user-specified coverage criterion, warning the user when, due to infeasible conditions in the program, this coverage cannot be attained.

Regarding program transformation, ECLAIR can be used to perform complex program transformations: these are specified by syntactic and semantics-based criteria; the program regions in the source that match these criteria can be optionally replaced by a parametrized substitution.

== See also ==
- Abstract interpretation
- Model checking
- Static code analysis
- List of tools for static code analysis
