= Jtest =

Testing and analysis software for Java programming language

mayank ganja
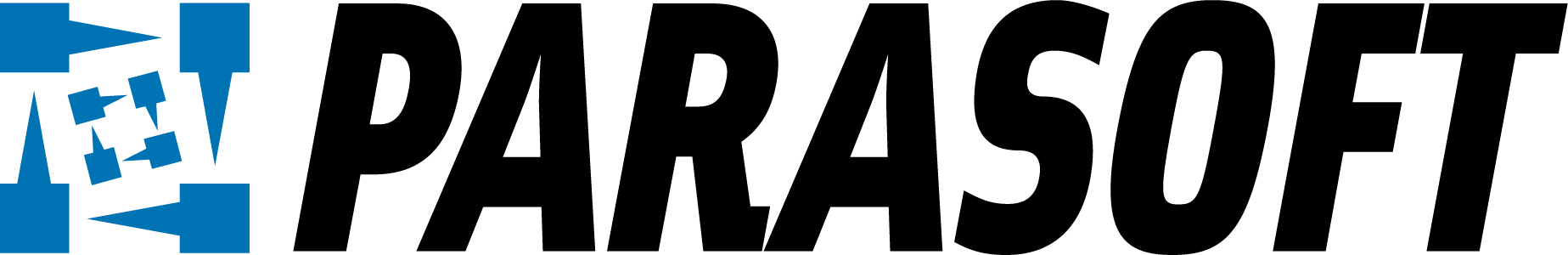
- Developer: Parasoft
- Release: 1997; 29 years ago
- Stable release: 2025.2 / November 1, 2025; 9 months ago
- Operating system: Linux, Mac OS X, Solaris, Windows
- Available in: English, Chinese, Japanese
- Type: Testing
- License: Proprietary commercial software
- Website: www.parasoft.com/products/jtest/

Jtest is an automated Java software testing and static analysis product developed by Parasoft. The product includes technology for data-flow analysis, unit test-case generation and execution, static analysis, and more. Jtest is used by companies such as Cisco Systems and TransCore. It is also used by Lockheed Martin for the F-35 Joint Strike Fighter program (JSF).

== Awards ==
Jtest received the Dr. Dobb's Journal Jolt Award for Excellence in 2000. It was granted a Codie award from the Software and Information Industry Association for "Best Software Testing Solution" in 2005 and 2007. It also won "Technology of the Year" award as "Best Application Test Tool" from InfoWorld two years in a row in 2006 and 2007.

== See also ==
- Automated testing
- List of unit testing frameworks
- List of tools for static code analysis
- Regression testing
- Software testing
- System testing
- Test case
- Test-driven development
- xUnit, a family of unit testing frameworks
