= Helix QAC =

Commercial static code analysis software

Helix QAC, formerly QA·C is a commercial static code analysis software tool produced by Minneapolis, Minnesota-based software vendor Perforce Software. QAC means Quality Assurance and Control. The software was originally developed in 1986 by UK-based Programming Research Limited (PRQA) for the C language. Perforce acquired PRQA in May 2018.

Helix QAC was used to make the C source code measurements given in the book Safer C by Les Hatton.

HeliX QAC can be used for quality assurance of C source code and checking the code for conformance to coding guidelines such as MISRA C. Other functionality includes the ability to calculate code metrics for projects with large code-bases.

The tools operate through an integrated development environment (IDE) designed to help maintain and understand old and new code using detailed cross references and a variety of graphical views. The tools can be used with a command line interface, and graphical IDE can be called to display the result.

== See also ==
- List of tools for static code analysis
