= Sparse (disambiguation) =

Sparse may refer to:

- Sparse, a software static analysis tool
- Sparse language, a type of formal language in computational complexity theory
- Sparse matrix, in numerical analysis, a matrix populated primarily with zeros
- Sparse file, a computer file mostly empty
- Sparse network, a network with many fewer connections than possible
