= Sparse =

Computer software coding tool

- Original author: Linus Torvalds
- Developers: Josh Triplett, Christopher Li, Luc Van Oostenryck
- Release: 2003
- Stable release: 0.6.4 / September 6, 2021; 5 years ago
- Written in: C
- Operating system: Linux, BSD, macOS, MinGW, Cygwin
- Type: Static code analysis
- License: MIT License
- Website: sparse.docs.kernel.org
- Repository: git.kernel.org/pub/scm/devel/sparse/sparse.git

Sparse is a computer software tool designed to find possible coding faults in the Linux kernel. Unlike other such tools, this static analysis tool was initially designed to only flag constructs that were likely to be of interest to kernel developers, such as the mixing of pointers to user and kernel address spaces.

Sparse checks for known problems and allows the developer to include annotations in the code that convey information about data types, such as the address space that pointers point to and the locks that a function acquires or releases.

Linus Torvalds started writing Sparse in 2003. Josh Triplett was its maintainer from 2006, a role taken over by Christopher Li in 2009 and by Luc Van Oostenryck in November 2018. Sparse is released under the MIT License.

== Annotations ==
Some of the checks performed by Sparse require annotating the source code using the __attribute__ GCC extension, or the Sparse-specific __context__ specifier. Sparse defines the following list of attributes:

- address_space(num)
- bitwise
- force
- context(expression,in_context,out_context)

When an API is defined with a macro, the specifier __attribute__((context(...))) can be replaced by __context__(...).

=== Linux kernel definitions ===
The Linux kernel defines the following short forms as pre-processor macros in files linux/compiler.h and linux/types.h (when building without the __CHECKER__ flag, all these annotations are removed from the code):

#ifdef __CHECKER__
# define __user		__attribute__((noderef, address_space(1)))
# define __kernel	__attribute__((address_space(0)))
# define __safe		__attribute__((safe))
# define __force	__attribute__((force))
# define __nocast	__attribute__((nocast))
# define __iomem	__attribute__((noderef, address_space(2)))
# define __must_hold(x)	__attribute__((context(x,1,1)))
# define __acquires(x)	__attribute__((context(x,0,1)))
# define __releases(x)	__attribute__((context(x,1,0)))
# define __acquire(x)	__context__(x,1)
# define __release(x)	__context__(x,-1)
# define __cond_lock(x,c)	((c) ? ({ __acquire(x); 1; }) : 0)
# define __percpu	__attribute__((noderef, address_space(3)))
#ifdef CONFIG_SPARSE_RCU_POINTER
# define __rcu		__attribute__((noderef, address_space(4)))
#else
# define __rcu
#endif
extern void __chk_user_ptr(const volatile void __user *);
extern void __chk_io_ptr(const volatile void __iomem *);
#else
# define __user
# define __kernel
# define __safe
# define __force
# define __nocast
# define __iomem
# define __chk_user_ptr(x) (void)0
# define __chk_io_ptr(x) (void)0
# define __builtin_warning(x, y...) (1)
# define __must_hold(x)
# define __acquires(x)
# define __releases(x)
# define __acquire(x) (void)0
# define __release(x) (void)0
# define __cond_lock(x,c) (c)
# define __percpu
# define __rcu
#endif

#ifdef __CHECKER__
# define __bitwise    __attribute__((bitwise))
#else
# define __bitwise
#endif

=== Examples ===
The types __le32 and __be32 represent 32-bit integer types with different endianness. However, the C language does not allow to specify that variables of these types should not be mixed. The bitwise attribute is used to mark these types as restricted, so Sparse will give a warning if variables of these types or other integer variables are mixed:

typedef __u32 __bitwise     __le32;
typedef __u32 __bitwise     __be32;

To mark valid conversions between restricted types, a casting with the force attribute is used to avoid Sparse giving a warning.

== See also ==
- List of tools for static code analysis
