= Semgrep =

Open-source static analysis software tool

Semgrep, Inc
- Formerly: r2c
- Industry: Computer Security
- Founded: 2017
- Founder: Isaac Evans; Luke O'Malley; Drew Dennison
- Website: semgrep.dev

Semgrep OSS
- Developers: Semgrep, Inc.
- Initial release: February 6, 2020; 5 years ago
- Stable release: 1.145.0 / December 5, 2025; 18 days ago
- Repository: github.com/semgrep/semgrep
- Written in: OCaml (core) and Python (CLI)
- Type: Static program analysis
- License: LGPL v2.1
- Website: semgrep.dev

Semgrep, Inc. (formerly r2c) is a cybersecurity company based in San Francisco. The company develops the Semgrep AppSec Platform, a commercial offering for SAST, SCA, and secrets scanning, and maintains the open-source static code analysis tool semgrep, which supports over 30 programming languages.

The name is a combination of semantic and grep, which refers to semgrep being a text search utility that is aware of source code semantics.

== Services ==
Semgrep, Inc. provides a continuous integration service (Semgrep CI), rule-writing tools (the Semgrep Playground), and a rule library (the Semgrep Registry) free of charge for both commercial and open source users.

Semgrep rules are typically written in YAML. Rules can be forked and customized to a user's codebase, however only commercial users can customize commercial rules. All users are free to fork and modify open source (community) rules.

== History ==
Semgrep was based on sgrep, an open source part of pfff, a program analysis library developed at Facebook in 2009. Pfff was inspired by Coccinelle, an open-source utility for programs written in C. Yoann Padioleau, the original author of sgrep and a contributor to Coccinelle, joined r2c in 2019. sgrep was forked from pfff by r2c, and in 2020 the sgrep fork was renamed semgrep to avoid name collisions with existing projects.

Redpoint Ventures and Sequoia Capital backed r2c in an unannounced seed round and later funded a $13 million Series A round in 2020. The company's product portfolio consisted only of Semgrep OSS and its ecosystem at the time.

Semgrep, Inc. announced in 2023 that it had raised a $53 million Series C funding round with Lightspeed Venture Partners leading the investment and participation from previous investors Felicis Ventures, Redpoint Ventures, and Sequoia Capital. The company has raised a total of $93 million, including their Series C financing.

The Open Web Application Security Project (OWASP) listed Semgrep in its source code analysis tools list. As of 2023 April, Semgrep has 132 contributors and over 9000 stars on GitHub. From Docker Hub the Docker image has been pulled more than 60 million times.

== Usage ==
Semgrep can be installed with Homebrew or pip. Additionally it can run without installation on Docker. Analysis can be done without the need of custom configuration, and by utilizing rulesets created by Semgrep Inc. and open source contributors. The tool also allows users to write their own patterns and rules through the CLI using a pattern language unique to semgrep. A free online rule editor and a tutorial are also available.

== See also ==
- List of tools for static code analysis
