= Fluid Attacks =

Application security company

- Type: Private
- Industry: Application security
- Founded: 2001
- Founders: Mauricio Gómez (Chief Revenue Officer); Rafael Álvarez (Executive Advisor); David Cardona (former Capacity Manager); Luis Bustamante (former Research and Development Director)
- Key people: Vladimir Villa (CEO)
- Website: fluidattacks.com

Fluid Attacks is an application security (AppSec) company founded in 2001 in Colombia. It specializes in security testing for software development companies through automated tools (SaaS) and penetration testing (PTaaS).

== History ==
Fluid Attacks was founded in 2001 by Mauricio Gómez, Rafael Álvarez, David Cardona, and Luis Bustamante, initially under the name Fluidsignal. The company began by providing the setup of secure networks, mainly based on Linux. In 2003, they decided to merge with another firm working with Linux, owned by entrepreneur Juan Guillermo Olarte, and changed their name to Fluidsignal Group.

At first, Fluidsignal Group designed, installed, and customized systems. However, in 2008, the team narrowed its offering and focused on providing IT security, including penetration testing and consulting. Shortly thereafter, Fluidsignal Group achieved ISO 9001 and 27001 certifications. Between 2011 and 2012, the group decided to limit its portfolio to penetration testing or ethical hacking only.

In 2014, the company participated in Ruta N's internationalization program. It started developing software for automated security tests and a vulnerability management platform. In 2016, recognizing itself as an offensive security team, the company changed its name to Fluid Attacks. In 2021, Fluid Attacks became an authorized company to assign unique CVE codes to the vulnerabilities it detected (i.e., CVE Numbering Authority, CNA, under the Researcher category).

In 2022, Fluid Attacks's open-source CLI for SAST-type scans was approved as a free tool for validating tier 2 requirements of the Alliance's Cloud Application Security Assessment (CASA) framework. That same year, at Black Hat USA, Fluid Attacks unveiled its open-source tool Makes, which was used to create isolated application environments for continuous integration/continuous deployment (CI/CD). This project, along with Fluid Attacks's core software repository, obtained a gold badge from the Open Source Security Foundation (OpenSSF).

== Operations and strategy ==
Fluid Attacks has been a self-funded company since its inception. It develops tools (e.g., a scanner for SAST, SCA, and DAST) and cybersecurity solutions primarily for industries such as banking, finance, technology, healthcare, and transportation. Fluid Attacks follows the DevSecOps approach, carrying out automatic and manual security tests—the latter to overcome the limitations of automated tools—throughout the software development lifecycle.

In 2019, Fluid Attacks began incorporating artificial intelligence into its products and operations. At that time, it developed technology to evaluate repositories and identify which files were most likely to have vulnerabilities, allowing its pentesters to prioritize them for assessment. In 2023, Fluid Attacks started to increase the use of generative AI in its products, especially for the automatic remediation of vulnerable code.

== Research and training ==
Since becoming a CNA, Fluid Attacks submits to the US National Vulnerability Database (NVD).

According to a 2021 article in Business Empresarial, the company has one of the largest red teams in the Americas. It has sponsored members of its team to participate in international hacking contests (e.g., CTF) and cybersecurity events. Since 2023, Fluid Attacks has been one of the sponsors of the Latin American team in the International Cybersecurity Challenge.

== See also ==
- Application security
- List of tools for static code analysis
- Penetration testing
- Software composition analysis
- Static application security testing
