= Cppdepend =

Static analysis tool for C/C++ code

CppDepend
- Developer: CppDepend
- Stable release: 2026.1.0 / February 3, 2026; 4 months ago
- Operating system: Multiplatform
- Type: Software quality
- License: Commercial Proprietary
- Website: www.cppdepend.com

CppDepend is a static analysis tool for C/C++ code. This tool supports a large number of code metrics, allows for visualization of dependencies using directed graphs and dependency matrix. The tools also performs code base snapshots comparison, and validation of architectural and quality rules. User-defined rules can be written using LINQ queries. This possibility is named CQLinq. The tool also comes with a large number of predefined CQLinq code rules.

== Features ==
The main features of CppDepend are:

- Support for Coding Standards: Misra C++, Misra C, Cert C, Cert C++, CWE, Autosar
- Support for C++23, C++20, C++17
- Declarative code rule over LINQ query (CQLinq)
- Dependency Visualization (using dependency graphs, and dependency matrix)
- Software metrics (CppDepend currently supports 82 code metrics: Cyclomatic complexity; Afferent and Efferent Coupling; Relational Cohesion; Percentage of code covered by tests, etc.)
- CppDepend can tell you what has been changed between 2 builds

New features in v2026.1

- Smart Code City
- Intellij Idea, VSCode and Eclipse Support
- Java Support

== Code Rule through LINQ Query (CQLinq) ==
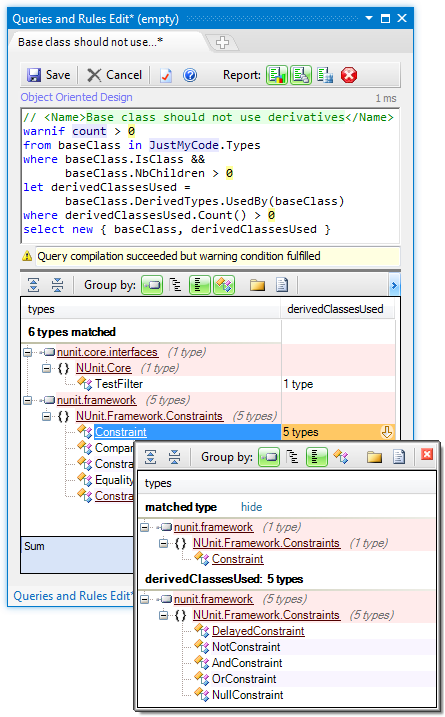
CQLinq editor and query result displayed

The tool proposes live code query and code rule through LINQ query. This is one of the innovations of CppDepend. For example:

- Classes inherit from a particular class:

// <Name>classes inherit from a particular class</Name>
from t in Types
where t.IsClass && t.DeriveFrom ("CBase")
select t

- The 10 most complex methods (Source Code Cyclomatic complexity)

// <Name>The 10 most complex methods</Name>
(from m in Methods
orderby m.CyclomaticComplexity
select new { m, m.CyclomaticComplexity }).Take(10)

In addition, the tool proposes a live CQLinq query editor with code completion and embedded documentation.

== See also ==
- Sourcetrail Free Open-Source source code explorer that provide interactive dependency graphs.
- Design Structure Matrix
- Software visualization
