= FX-87 =

FX-87 is a polymorphic typed functional language based on a system for static program analysis in which every expression has two static properties: a type and an effect. In a study done by MIT, FX-87 yields similar performance results to functional languages on programs that do not contain side effects (Fibonacci, Factorial). FX-87 did yield a great performance increase when matching DNA sequences.

KFX is the kernel language of FX-87. It was described in 'Polymorphic Effect Systems,' J.M. Lucassen et al., Proceedings of the 15th Annual ACM Conference POPL, ACM 1988, pp. 47–57.
