= Cppcheck =

Static code analysis tool

- Original author: Daniel Marjamäki
- Initial release: May 8, 2007; 18 years ago
- Stable release: 2.18.0 / 20 July 2025; 6 months ago
- Repository: github.com/danmar/cppcheck
- Written in: C++
- Operating system: Cross-platform
- Available in: English, Dutch, Finnish, Swedish, German, Russian, Japanese, Serbian, Spanish, French, Italian, Korean, Chinese
- Type: Static code analysis
- License: GNU General Public License
- Website: cppcheck.sourceforge.io

Cppcheck is a static code analysis tool for the C and C++ programming languages. It is a versatile tool that can check non-standard code. The creator and lead developer is Daniel Marjamäki.

Cppcheck is Open-core software, with its open-source core code under the GNU General Public License.

== Features ==
Cppcheck supports a wide variety of static checks that may not be covered by the compiler itself. These checks are static analysis checks that can be performed at a source code level. The program is directed towards static analysis checks that are rigorous, rather than heuristic in nature.

Some of the checks that are supported include:

- Automatic variable checking
- Bounds checking for array overruns
- Classes checking (e.g. unused functions, variable initialization and memory duplication)
- Usage of deprecated or superseded functions according to Open Group
- Exception safety checking, for example usage of memory allocation and destructor checks
- Memory leaks, e.g. due to lost scope without deallocation
- Resource leaks, e.g. due to forgetting to close a file handle
- Invalid usage of Standard Template Library functions and idioms
- Dead code elimination using unusedFunction option
- Miscellaneous stylistic and performance errors

As with many analysis programs, there are many unusual cases of programming idioms that may be acceptable in particular target cases or outside of the programmer's scope for source code correction. A study conducted in March 2009 identified several areas where false positives were found by Cppcheck, but did not specify the program version examined. Cppcheck has been identified for use in systems such as CERN’s 4DSOFT meta analysis package, for code verification in high energy particle detector readout devices, system monitoring software for radio telescopes as well as in error analysis of large projects, such as OpenOffice.org and the Debian archive.

== Development ==
The project is actively under development and is actively maintained in different distributions. It has found valid bugs in a number of popular projects such as the Linux kernel and MPlayer.

== Plugins ==
Plugins for the following IDEs or text editors exist

- CLion
- Code::Blocks - integrated.
- CodeLite - integrated.
- Eclipse
- Emacs
- gedit
- Hudson
- Jenkins
- Kate
- KDevelop
- Qt Creator
- Sublime Text
- Visual Studio
- Yasca

== See also ==
- List of tools for static code analysis
