= PVS-Studio =

Computer code analyzer

- Developer: PVS-Studio LLC
- Stable release: 8.0 / August 19, 2026; 2 months ago
- Operating system: Windows, Linux, macOS
- Type: Static code analysis Security testing
- License: Proprietary
- Website: pvs-studio.com/en/pvs-studio/

PVS-Studio is a proprietary static code analyzer on guard of code quality, security, and code safety supporting C, C++, C++11, C++/CLI, C++/CX, C#, Java, JavaScript, TypeScript, Go.

PVS‑Studio detects various errors types, dead code, and potential vulnerabilities (static application security testing, or SAST), the analyzer matches warnings to the common weakness enumeration, SEI CERT coding standards, and supports the MISRA standard. PVS‑Studio warning classifications for various standards:

- CVE (common weakness enumeration)
- SEI CERT coding standard
- MISRA
- OWASP application security verification standard

PVS-Studio supports integration with the most diverse development tools and compilation systems, as Visual Studio 2022, IntelliJ IDEA, Rider, CLion, VSCode, Qt Creator, Eclipse, MSBuild, CMake, Make, Ninja, Gradle, Maven, Azure DevOps, Unity, and Unreal 5.

== See also ==
- List of tools for static code analysis
- Security testing
