= Polyspace =

Static program analysis tool

- Developer: MathWorks
- Stable release: R2026a / April 15, 2026; 3 months ago
- Operating system: Cross-platform
- Type: static code analysis
- License: Proprietary
- Website: www.mathworks.com/products/polyspace.html

Polyspace is a static code analysis tool for large-scale analysis by abstract interpretation to detect, or prove the absence of, certain run-time errors in source code for the C, C++, and Ada programming languages. The tool also checks source code for adherence to appropriate code standards.

== History ==
Polyspace was originally developed by the French company PolySpace Technologies, which was acquired by MathWorks in 2007. The product was subsequently integrated into MATLAB.

== Common uses ==
Polyspace examines the source code to determine where potential run-time errors such as arithmetic overflow, buffer overrun, division by zero, and others could occur. Software developers and quality assurance managers use this information to identify which parts of the code are faulty or proven to be reliable. Other parts of the code are marked for unproven checks and deserve individual review.

Code standards or guidelines such as MISRA C attempt to address code quality, portability, and reliability. The product checks C and C++ source code for conformance to a subset of rules in these coding standards.

== Capabilities ==
The product family consists of Polyspace Code Prover and Polyspace Bug Finder. The Code Prover module annotates source code with a color-coding scheme to indicate the status of each element in the code. It uses formal methods-based static code analysis to verify program execution at the language level. The tool checks each code instruction by taking into account all possible values of every variable at every point in the code, providing a formal diagnostic for each operation in the code under both normal and abnormal usage conditions.

The Bug Finder module identifies software bugs by performing static program analysis on source code. It finds defects such as numerical computation, programming, memory, and other errors. It also produces software metrics such as Comment density of a source file, Cyclomatic complexity, Number of lines, parameters, call levels, etc. in a function, Identified run-time errors in the software.

== See also ==
- List of tools for static code analysis
