= Bauhaus Project (computing) =

Software research project collaboration

The Bauhaus project is a software research project collaboration among the University of Stuttgart, the University of Bremen, and a commercial spin-off company Axivion, also known as Bauhaus Software Technologies.

The Bauhaus project serves the fields of software maintenance and software reengineering.

Created in response to the problem of software rot, the project aims to analyze and recover the means and methods developed for legacy software by understanding the software's architecture. As part of its research, the project develops software tools (such as the Bauhaus Toolkit) for software architecture, software maintenance and reengineering and program understanding.

The project derives its name from the former Bauhaus art school.

== History ==
The Bauhaus project was initiated by Profs. Erhard Ploedereder and Rainer Koschke at the University of Stuttgart in 1996. It was originally a collaboration between the Institute for Computer Science (ICS) of the University of Stuttgart and the Fraunhofer Institute for Experimental Software Engineering IESE, which is no longer involved.

The Bauhaus project was funded^{a} by the state of Baden-Württemberg, the Deutschen Forschungsgemeinschaft, the Bundesministerium für Bildung und Forschung, T-Nova Deutsche Telekom Innovationsgesellschaft Ltd., and Xerox Research.

Early versions of Bauhaus integrated and used Rigi for visualization.

The commercial spin-off Axivion GmbH, headquartered in Stuttgart, was started in 2005. Research then was done at Axivion, the Institute of Software Technology, Department of Programming Languages at the University of Stuttgart as well as at the Software Engineering Group of the Faculty 03 at the University of Bremen.

Formerly, the academic version of the "Bauhaus" was offered. Today, the software product is sold commercially as Axivion Suite. The latter includes MISRA C checks among other verification services.

On August 11, 2022, the Qt Group acquired Axivion GmbH. Since then, the Axivion Suite has been further developed and distributed by the Qt Group's Quality Assurance business unit.

Axivion Suite
- Developer: Axivion GmbH (part of Qt Group)
- Stable release: 7.8 / 2024-07-04
- Type: Static program analysis
- License: Proprietary
- Website: https://www.qt.io/product/quality-assurance/axivion-suite

== Bauhaus Toolkit now Axivion Suite ==
The Bauhaus Toolkit (or simply the "Bauhaus tool") includes a static code analysis tool for C, C++, C#, Java and Ada code. It comprises various analyses such as architecture checking, interface analysis, and clone detection. Bauhaus was originally derived from the older Rigi reverse engineering environment, which was expanded by Bauhaus due to the Rigi's limitations. It is considered one of the most notable visualization tools in the field.

The Bauhaus tool suite aids the analysis of source code by creating abstractions (representations) of the code in an intermediate language as well as through a resource flow graph (RFG). The RFG is a hierarchal graph with typed nodes and edges, which are structured in various views.

While the Axivion Suite has its origins in the Bauhaus project, it is now considered a different product with a broader range of services, such as static code analyses, such as MISRA checking, architecture verification, include analysis, defect detection, and clone management.

== Reception ==
The Bauhaus tool suite has been used successfully in research and commercial projects. It has been noted that Bauhaus is "perhaps [the] most extensive" customization of the well-known Rigi environment,

The members of the project were repeatedly awarded with Best Paper Awards and were invited to submit journal papers several times.

In 2003, the Bauhaus project received the do it software award from MFG Stiftung Baden-Württemberg.

== Footnotes ==
- ^a Regarding the project's founding, the years 1996 and 1997 seem to appear equally often among the various sources.
