= Automated code review =

Code reviewing software

Automated code review refers to the use of software tools and techniques to assist or fully automate the process of reviewing source code for defects, style issues, security vulnerabilities, and maintainability concerns. Such tools are widely used in modern software engineering, particularly within continuous integration (CI) and continuous delivery (CD) pipelines.

== Overview ==
The use of analytical methods to inspect and review source code to detect bugs or security issues has been a standard development practice in both open source and commercial software domains. This process can be accomplished both manually and in an automated fashion. With automation, software tools provide assistance with the code review and inspection process. The review program or tool typically displays a list of warnings (violations of programming standards). A review program can also provide an automated or a programmer-assisted way to correct the issues found. This is a component for mastering easily software. This is contributing to the Software Intelligence practice. This process is usually called "linting" since one of the first tools for static code analysis was called Lint.

Some static code analysis tools can be used to help with automated code review. They do not compare favorably to manual reviews, however they can be done faster and more efficiently. These tools also encapsulate deep knowledge of underlying rules and semantics required to perform this type analysis such that it does require the human code reviewer to have the same level of expertise as an expert human auditor. Many Integrated Development Environments also provide basic automated code review functionality. For example, the Eclipse and Microsoft Visual Studio IDEs support a variety of plugins that facilitate code review.

Next to static code analysis tools, there are also tools that analyze and visualize software structures and help humans to better understand these. Such systems are geared more to analysis because they typically do not contain a predefined set of rules to check software against. Some of these tools (e.g. Imagix 4D, Resharper, SonarJ, Sotoarc, Structure101, ACTool) allow one to define target architectures and enforce that target architecture constraints are not violated by the actual software implementation.

Recent research has also explored the use of large language models (LLMs) as components in automated code review workflows. General-purpose code models trained on open-source code have been evaluated in a "zero-shot" setting, where the model is asked to propose fixes for security vulnerabilities directly from source code and associated diagnostics. These studies report that LLMs can repair some simple or synthetic vulnerabilities, but that their performance degrades on complex, real-world bugs, with generated patches often being incomplete or functionally incorrect. As a result, current work treats LLMs as potential assistants that can suggest candidate patches to be validated by traditional analysis tools and human reviewers, rather than as reliable standalone code review systems.

== Applications ==
Automated code review is used in:

- large-scale open-source projects hosted on platforms such as GitHub, where continuous integration services automatically run builds and test suites on change sets;
- safety-critical industries, such as automotive and aerospace, where static analysis and related automated checks are used to support compliance with functional safety standards and reduce the risk of software defects in deployed systems;
- security-focused development workflows, where static application security testing (SAST) tools and related analyzers are integrated into CI/CD pipelines to automatically scan source code for vulnerabilities.

== See also ==
- Program analysis (computer science)
