= Coverity =

American software company

Coverity, LLC
- Type: Private
- Industry: Security testing, static program analysis, software development
- Founded: November 2002
- Fate: Acquired by Black Duck Software in 2025
- Headquarters: formerly San Francisco, California
- Key people: Jason Schmitt (current GM)
- Products: Coverity Code Advisor, Coverity Code Advisor on Demand, Coverity Scan, Coverity Test Advisor, Seeker
- Number of employees: 250+
- Parent: Black Duck Software
- Website: blackduck.com

Coverity is a proprietary static code analysis tool from Black Duck, Inc. This product enables engineers and security teams to find and fix software defects.

Coverity started as an independent software company in 2002 at the Computer Systems Laboratory at Stanford University in Palo Alto, California. It was founded by Benjamin Chen, Andy Chou, David Park, and Seth Hallem with Stanford professor Dawson Engler as a technical adviser. The headquarters was moved to San Francisco. In June 2008, Coverity acquired Solidware Technologies. In February 2014, Coverity announced an agreement to be acquired by Synopsys, an electronic design automation company, for $375M in cash.

== Products ==
Coverity is a static code analysis tool for C, C++, C#, Java, JavaScript, PHP, Python, .NET, ASP.NET, Objective-C, Go, JSP, Ruby, Swift, Fortran, Scala, VB.NET, and TypeScript. It also supports more than 70 different frameworks for Java, JavaScript, C# and other languages.

Coverity Scan is a free static-analysis cloud-based service for the open source community.

== Applications ==
Under a United States Department of Homeland Security contract in 2006, the tool was used to examine over 150 open source applications for bugs; 6000 bugs found by the scan were fixed across 53 projects.

The National Highway Traffic Safety Administration used the tool in its 2010-2011 investigation into reports of sudden unintended acceleration in Toyota vehicles. The tool was used by CERN on the software employed in the Large Hadron Collider and in the NASA Jet Propulsion Laboratory during the flight software development of the Mars rover Curiosity.
