= SonarQube =

Open-source platform for continuous inspection of code quality

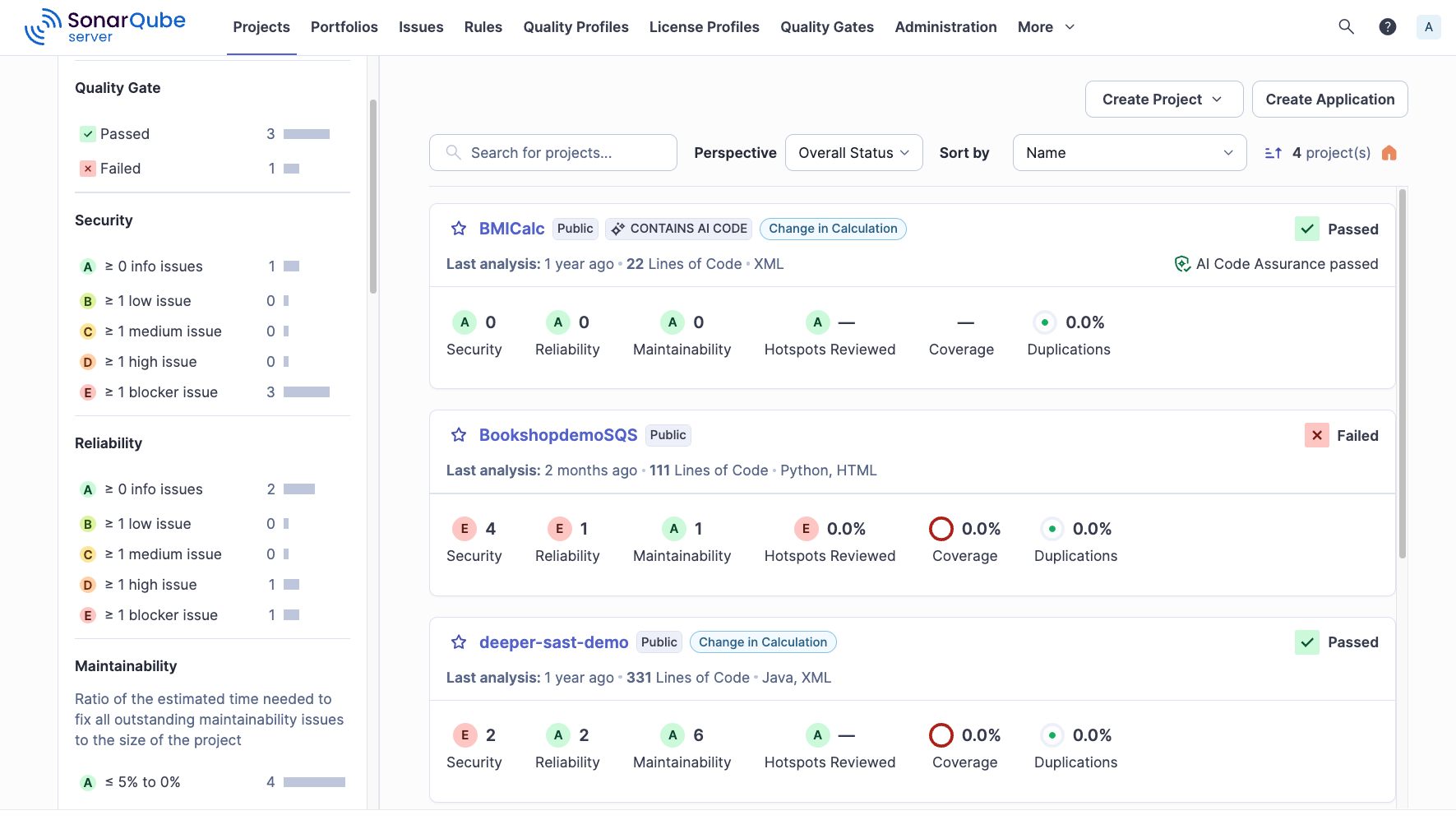
- A SonarQube project homepage
- Developer: Sonar
- Release: 2006–2007
- Stable release: SonarQube Server Release 2025.1 / Jan 2025
- Written in: Java
- Operating system: Cross-platform
- Type: Static code analysis
- License: Partly Proprietary and partly GNU Lesser General Public License
- Website: Official website
- Repository: github.com/SonarSource/sonarqube

SonarQube is an open-core static code analysis platform developed by Sonar. It scans source code to detect issues like bugs, vulnerabilities and code smells on various programming languages and infrastructure technologies. SonarQube offers reports on duplicated code, coding standards, unit tests, code coverage, technical debt, code complexity, comments, bugs, software bill of materials (SBOMs), and security recommendations.

== Overview ==
SonarQube analyzes code to detect problems related to software security, reliability, and maintainability. It integrates with DevOps platforms, including GitHub, Bitbucket, Azure, and GitLab. The commercial offerings of SonarQube supports programming languages such as Java (including Android), C#, C, C++, JavaScript, TypeScript, Python, Go, Swift, COBOL, Apex, PHP, Kotlin, Ruby, Scala, HTML, CSS, ABAP, Flex, Objective-C, PL/I, PL/SQL, RPG, T-SQL, VB.NET, VB6, and XML.

=== Products ===
The umbrella term SonarQube encompasses multiple products:

- SonarQube Server (formerly known as just SonarQube) is the self-hosted variant of the tool.
- SonarQube Community Build is a free and open-source build of SonarQube Server that lacks the proprietary features.
- SonarQube Cloud (formerly SonarCloud) is a fully managed SaaS solution.
- SonarQube for IDE (formerly SonarLint) is a summary term for the various IDE plug-ins for Eclipse, Visual Studio, Visual Studio Code, Cursor, Windsurf, and IntelliJ IDEA.
- SonarQube Advanced Security is a licensable feature that extends the code security capabilities to support scanning third-party open source code.

== Features ==
=== Advanced Static Application Security Testing (SAST) ===
Advanced SAST, included in SonarQube Advanced Security, scans for vulnerabilities that stem from the analyzed code interacting with third-party open-source dependencies for Java, C#, and JavaScript/TypeScript code.

=== Software Composition Analysis (SCA) ===
SCA, included in SonarQube Advanced Security, lists known vulnerabilities (CVEs) in third-party dependencies, generates software bill of materials (SBOMs) and enforces open source license policies.

=== AI Code Assurance ===
AI Code Assurance detects code created in GitHub projects by GitHub Copilot and applies a separate static analysis rule set to this code.

=== AI CodeFix ===
AI CodeFix automatically generates suggestions to fix issues detected by static code analysis within the IDE plugins or in SonarQube Cloud and Server.

=== Secrets Detection ===
Secrets Detection flags secrets in source code, both in code repositories and the supported IDEs, for example, passwords, application programming interface (API) keys, encryption keys, tokens, database credentials.

== See also ==
- List of tools for static code analysis
