= List of Ada software and tools =

Ada software and development tools

This is a list of software and programming tools for the Ada programming language, including IDEs, compilers, libraries, verification and debugging tools, numerical and scientific computing libraries, and related projects.

== Compilers ==
- GNAT — GCC Ada compiler and toolchain, maintained by AdaCore
- AdaCore GNAT Pro — commercial Ada compiler with advanced tooling for high-integrity and real-time systems
- Green Hills compiler for Ada — Ada compiler for embedded and safety-critical systems
- ObjectAda — Ada development environment for safety-critical and embedded systems

== Integrated development environments (IDEs) and editors ==
- GNAT Studio — IDE developed by AdaCore
- Emacs — supports Ada editing with Ada mode and syntax checking
- Eclipse — supports Ada through GNATbench plugin
- Visual Studio Code — Ada support via Ada Language Server extensions

== Libraries and frameworks ==
See also: Ada Libraries on Wikibooks

- Ada.Calendar — date and time library
- Ada Web Services (AWS) — support for RESTful and SOAP web services
- Ada.Text_IO — standard library for text input/output
- Florist (POSIX Ada binding) – open-source implementation of the POSIX Ada bindings
- GNAT – Ada compiler part of GCC, which also provides an extensive runtime and library package hierarchy.
- GtkAda – Ada bindings for the GTK+ graphical user interface toolkit
- Matreshka – multipurpose Ada framework supporting Unicode, XML, JSON, and more.
- XML/Ada – XML and Unicode processing library

== Real-time and embedded systems ==
- Ada tasking — built-in concurrency support with tasks, protected objects, and rendezvous.
- Ada.Real_Time — real-time clocks, delays, and scheduling.
- ARINC 653 Ada profiles — for avionics real-time applications
- OpenMP Ada bindings — parallel programming for multi-core embedded systems
- Ravenscar profile — subset of Ada tasking for real-time and deterministic execution

== Numerical and scientific computing ==
- Ada.Numerics — libraries for numerical methods, linear algebra, and mathematical functions.
- SPARK math libraries — formal-methods-compliant numerical routines

== Verification, debugging, and analysis ==
- GNATprove — formal verification and static analysis tool for Ada and SPARK
- GNATstack — runtime stack analysis and checking
- GNATcoverage — code coverage measurement for Ada projects
- AdaControl — style checking and metrics for Ada

== Testing frameworks ==
- AUnit — unit testing framework for Ada
- GNATtest — automated testing framework for Ada

== Documentation and code generation ==
- GNATdoc — generates HTML documentation from Ada source code

== See also ==
- High-integrity software
- Lists of programming software development tools by language
- SPARK (programming language) — formally defined computer programming language based on the Ada language
- Wikibooks Ada Programming
