= Concurrent Computer Corporation =

American computing vendor

- Company type: Public
- Traded as: Nasdaq: CCUR
- Industry: Computer systems
- Founded: 1985; 41 years ago
- Fate: 2017, pieces acquired by Battery Ventures and Vecima Networks
- Headquarters: Monmouth County, NJ; Fort Lauderdale, FL; Duluth, GA
- Key people: James K. Sims; Denis R. Brown; John Stihl; Corky Siegel
- Products: Series 3200; Series 5000; Series 6000; Series 8000; iHawk; MediaHawk
- Revenue: $247 million (1987)
- Number of employees: 1,700 (1985); 2,800 (1988); 1,250 (1993)
- Website: www.ccur.com

Concurrent Computer Corporation was an American computer company, in existence from 1985 to 2017, that made real-time computing and parallel processing systems. Its products powered a variety of applications including process control, simulators, data acquisition, and video-on-demand. It was based in Monmouth County, New Jersey, initially, and then later in Fort Lauderdale, Florida and Duluth, Georgia.

== Origins and initial efforts ==
The company was created in November 1985 when the computing division of Perkin-Elmer, the Data Systems Group, was spun off as a separate company. The computing group, which had started out as the company Interdata before Perkin-Elmer acquired it in 1974, had been profitable with sales of $259 million, but had tended to have reduced visibility within the computing industry due to being owned by a diversified parent. At first, the new company was a wholly owned subsidiary of Perkin-Elmer, but with the intentions of putting a minority ownership in the company up for a public stock offering. This was subsequently done, with Perkin-Elmer retaining an 82 percent stake in Concurrent; the remainder went on sale in February 1986 and opened at $20 per share. The stock traded on the NASDAQ exchange.

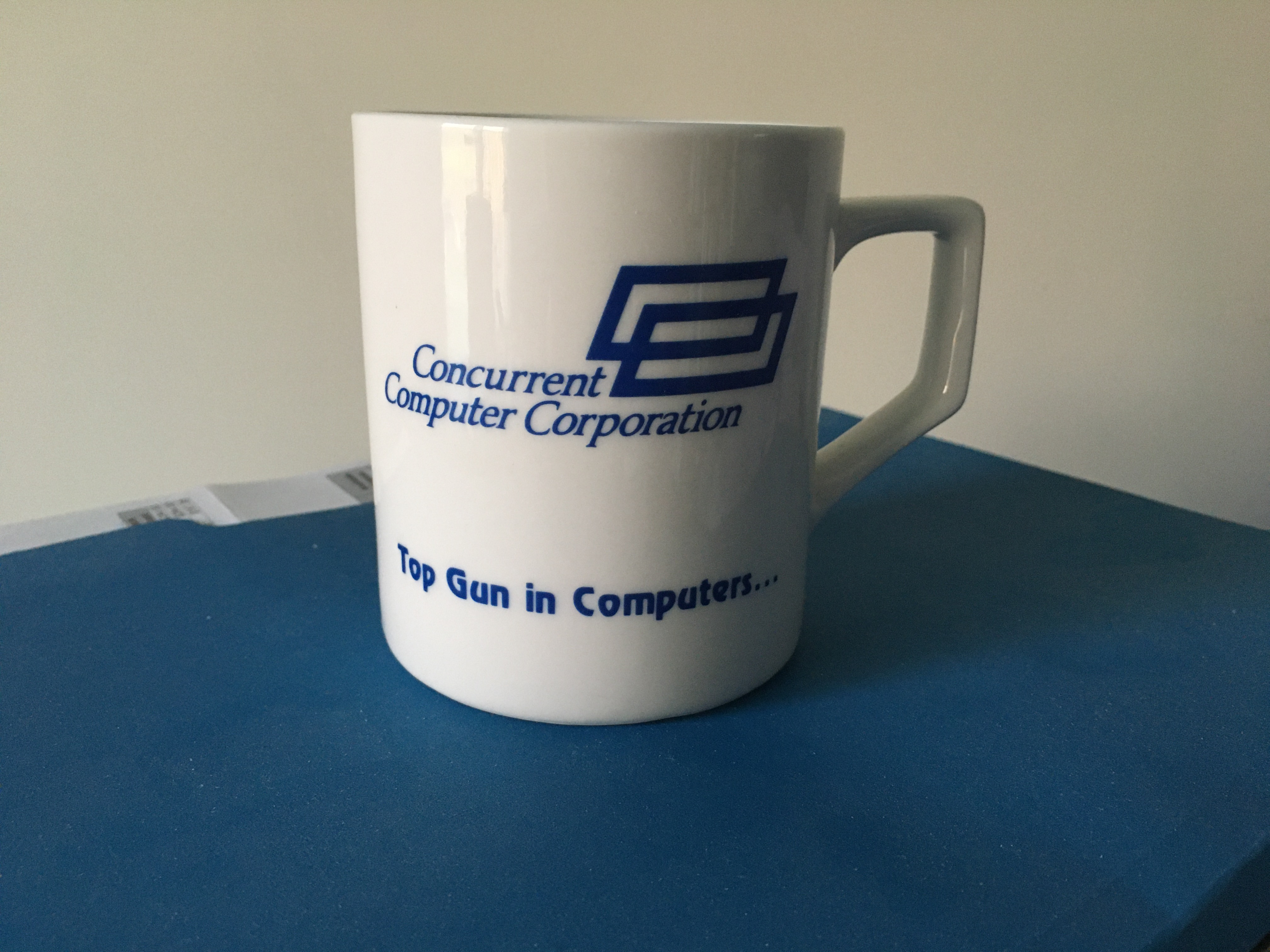
Promotional ceramic mug c. late 1980s, showing the company's original logo

James K. Sims, who had been general manager of the computer unit within Perkin-Elmer, became president and CEO of the new company. It had a large presence in Monmouth County, New Jersey, with some 1,700 staff making it one of the county's largest private employers. Its plant in Oceanport had 800 employees alone.

By 1987, Concurrent had nine separate offices in various locations in Monmouth County. Corporate headquarters had initially been Holmdel, but during 1987 moved to Tinton Falls.

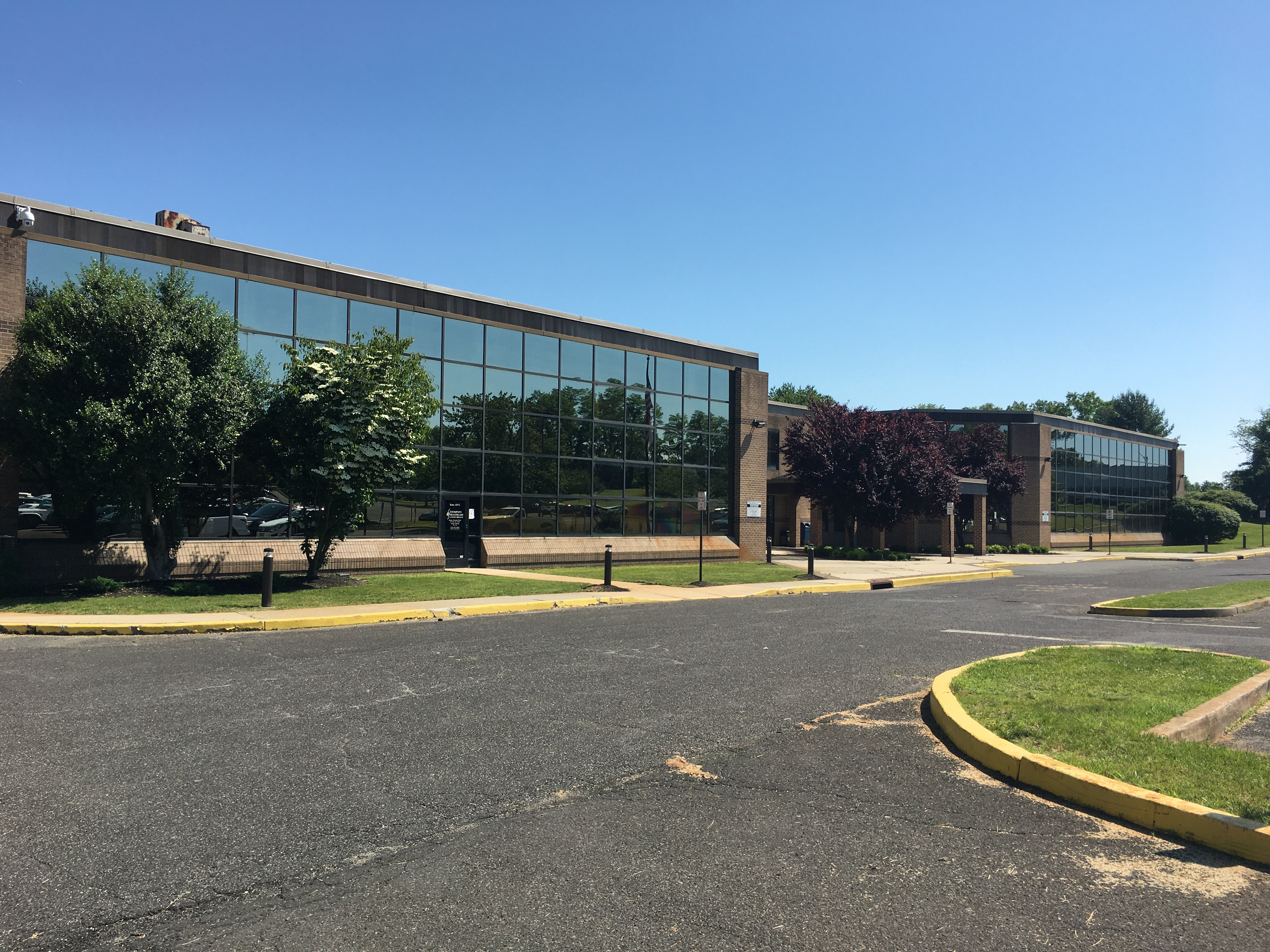
Concurrent Computer Corporation had engineering offices and sometimes its headquarters in this building (seen here in 2022) in Tinton Falls, New Jersey

The initial focus of Concurrent Computer Corporation was in the 32-bit superminicomputer market, with an offering that emphasized parallel processing. Their oldest product was the Series 3200, which came from its Interdata heritage and was based around a proprietary discrete component processor that supported 8 sets of registers and was built using the AMD Am2900 bit-slice chip set. The 3200 Series ran the OS/32 real-time operating system. Two newer products were the Series 5000, based on a Motorola 68020 processor, and the Series 6000, based on a Motorola 68030. In these products, the company focused on the market for high-end, rapid-response applications. Aircraft simulators were an especially important market.

Many of Concurrent's customers were in the defense and aerospace industry. Accordingly, Concurrent offered a line of compilers for the Ada programming language that at the time was often mandated for such applications. The company's C3Ada product came out in 1987; it ran on OS/32 and was among the early wave of commercial products to get past the strenuous Ada Compiler Validation Capability (ACVC) validation suite. The company's languages group investigated the challenges of implementing Ada, with its built-in tasking feature, on a real-time system with multiple processors, and in how best the requirements of real-time systems could be expressed in the language.

The Fortran programming language was perhaps the most popular choice for applications on the Concurrent platform. Optimizing Fortran for a shared-memory multiprocessor presented special issues regarding do loops and cache thrashing, a subject that the compiler staff at Concurrent studied extensively.

By 1988, there were some 2,800 employees in the company overall, and at its peak, the Oceanport manufacturing facility would have nearly 1,000 people working at it. Revenue for 1987 was $247 million.

== Merger with MASSCOMP ==
An announcement was made on August 1, 1988, that there would be a merger between Concurrent Computer Corporation and the Massachusetts Computer Corporation (MASSCOMP). Technically, MASSCOMP purchased Concurrent for $241 million and was the surviving company, even though Concurrent was more than three times the larger of the two. This "minnow-swallows-the-whale" style of merger was prevalent during the 1980s and in this case, as often happened in the era, it was largely financed by junk bonds. As part of the deal, MASSCOMP bought out Perkin-Elmer's share in Concurrent. Unusually, the merged entity kept the name Concurrent Computer Corporation and Sims remained as CEO of it. The merged company's headquarters was the one used for Concurrent in New Jersey, which was also somewhat atypical. The transaction closed on September 27, 1988.

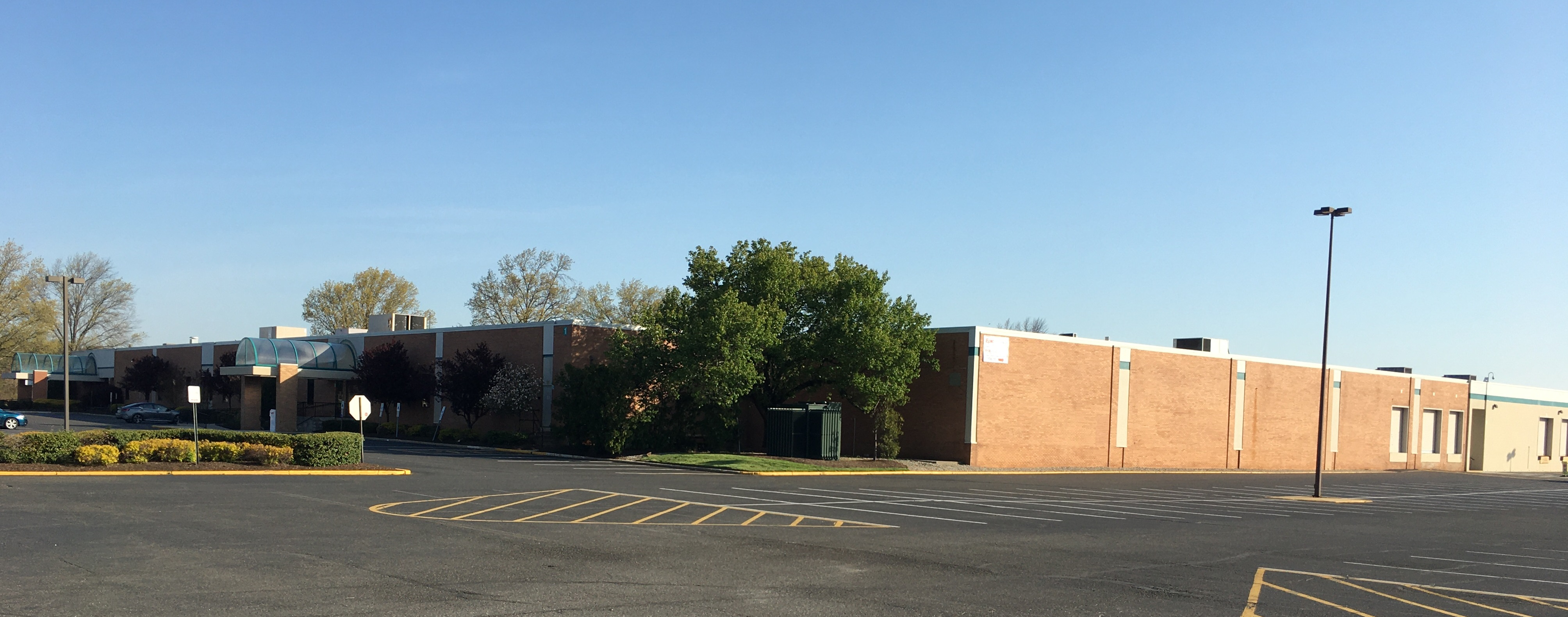
This large building in Oceanport, New Jersey, was the site of Concurrent's manufacturing facility and sometimes its headquarters (seen here in 2022); it consisted of four interconnected structures that were built during the Interdata and Perkin-Elmer years

The idea behind the merger was to use MASSCOMP's lower-end offerings in the real-time space to complement Concurrent's higher-end products. In addition, MASSCOMP brought expertise in the Unix operating system, which was rapidly becoming the popular choice for these kind of system offerings. The MASSCOMP flavor of Unix was called RTU, for Real-time Unix. It was featured as the operating system on the Series 5000 and Series 6000 systems.

As it happened, the merger was fraught with obstacles. The debt load imposed by the acquisition proved difficult to reduce, a problem made worse by the advent of the early 1990s recession in the United States, and there were a series of layoffs in the Monmouth County facilities. There were also severe clashes of company culture and dueling product development teams. Finally, improved offerings in the real-time space by larger competitors such as IBM and Digital Equipment Corporation proved difficult to undercut. As one industry analyst subsequently said, the merger "didn't produce anything but problems for Concurrent." In 1990 there was a change at the CEO position at Concurrent, with Sims out and Denis R. Brown in. Soon as well a turnaround expert had been brought in. Another CEO switch happened in 1993, with John Stihl taking over.

The company continued to be involved in the Ada language world during the 1990s. This included being a rapporteur during the Ada 9X definition process, as well as participating in the definition of the Ada Semantic Interface Specification (ASIS).

By the early 1990s, Concurrent had about 1,250 employees. It put out the Series 8000 product, which was based on the MIPS R3000 processor with RTU running on it. The company's major sales areas were in applications that included weather forecasting, air control, radar simulation, and financial trading.

== Merger with Harris Computer Systems ==
Due to repayments and a debt-for-equity swap, by 1995 the company's debt load had been reduced from $200 million to under $25 million. A competitor at this point was Harris Computer Systems, a real-time computer systems enterprise recently spun off from Harris Corporation. In 1995, Harris Computer Systems, led by its chief executive E. Courtney "Corky" Siegel, looked to buy Concurrent Computer Corporation, but the discussions ended in acrimony.

Negotiations resumed the following year, albeit in the opposite direction, and in June 1996, Concurrent acquired the high-performance computer business of Harris Computer Systems. However, the corporate headquarters was moved from New Jersey to Harris's location of Fort Lauderdale, Florida. Most of the rest of the New Jersey operations, which had been dwindling due to rounds of layoffs and employees leaving, soon followed. As the Asbury Park Press wrote of the Oceanport facility, "The former headquarters of Concurrent Computer Corp. [is] a once bustling place that has been nearly emptied by corporate downsizing". In July 1997, Concurrent sold the Oceanport building, although it still leasebacked a smaller manufacturing and servicing capability within it, responsible for keeping going an older product line.

In 1999, the headquarters of Concurrent was again moved, to Duluth, Georgia, in the Atlanta metropolitan area. Now CEO of Concurrent, Siegel said the relocation was for better executive access to the rest of the country and for a better talent pool; a factory remained in Pompano Beach, Florida. While Siegel wanted to emphasize the company's video-on-demand product, called MediaHawk, most of the company's $82 million in annual revenues still came from the real-time systems product line.

By the early 2000s, Concurrent was continuing its focus on the video-on-demand market and was selling to companies such as AOL Time Warner and Cox Communications. It also still had a presence in the defense industry, though, with Lockheed Martin as a customer. Its real-time systems were run using RedHawk Linux, Concurrent's adaptation of Red Hat Enterprise Linux for real-time requirements. By this time, Concurrent's systems were based on the Intel/AMD processor architecture. Technologies such as these were included in Concurrent's iHawk systems product.

== End ==
During 2017, the pieces of Concurrent Computer Corporation were sold off. In May 2017, the real-time systems business was acquired by the private equity firm Battery Ventures for $35 million. The resulting division was named Concurrent Real-Time, which was later acquired for $166.7 million by Brüel & Kjær, a subsidiary of Spectris plc, in July 2021. In October 2017, the video content delivery and storage business was acquired by the Canadian telecommunications firm Vecima Networks for $29 million, in a transaction that appears to have closed in very early 2018.
