= A Sharp (.NET) =

Programming language port

A#
- Designed by: Dr. Martin C. Carlisle, Lt Col Ricky Sward, Maj Jeff Humphries
- Developer: AdaCore
- First appeared: 2004; 22 years ago
- Platform: Common Language Infrastructure
- OS: Cross-platform
- License: GNU General Public License
- Website: www.asharp.martincarlisle.com

A# is a port of the Ada programming language to the Microsoft .NET platform. A# is freely distributed by the Department of Computer Science at the United States Air Force Academy as a service to the Ada community under the terms of the GNU General Public License.

AdaCore took over this development in 2007, and announced "GNAT for .NET", which is a fully supported .NET product with all of the features of A# and more. As of 2021, A# has fallen dramatically in popularity and is considered by some to be a dead language (there are no known users or implementations).

== Examples ==
=== Hello, world! ===
with Ada.Text_IO;
use Ada.Text_IO;
procedure Hello_Dotnet is
begin
 Put_Line(Item => "Hello, world!");
end Hello_Dotnet;
