= Robert Dewar =

Computer scientist

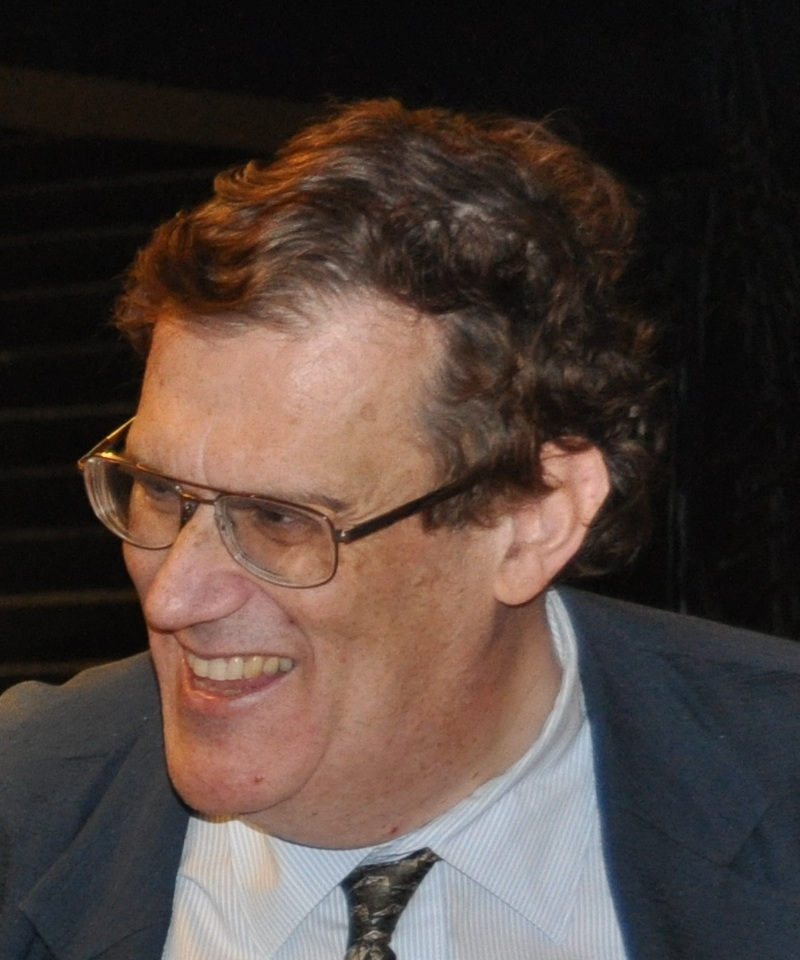
- Robert Dewar
- Born: Robert Berriedale Keith Dewar; 21 June 1945; Oxford, England, United Kingdom
- Died: 30 June 2015 (aged 70); Bennington, Vermont, United States
- Education: University of Chicago (B.S., 1964; Ph.D., 1968)
- Known for: IFIP WG 2.1 member, chairperson AdaCore cofounder, president, CEO
- Scientific career
- Fields: Computer science
- Institutions: Illinois Institute of Technology; New York University; AdaCore
- Thesis: (1968)
- Doctoral students: Anita Borg
- Website: www.cs.nyu.edu/cs/faculty/dewar

Robert Berriedale Keith Dewar (21 June 1945 – 30 June 2015) was an American computer scientist and educator. He helped to develop programming languages and compilers and was an outspoken advocate of freely licensed open-source software. He was a cofounder, CEO, and president of the AdaCore software company. He was also an enthusiastic amateur performer and musician, especially with the Village Light Opera Group in New York City.

== Early life and education ==
Dewar was born in Oxford, England, one of two sons of the theoretical chemist Michael J. S. Dewar and Mary Dewar, née Williamson (d. 1994), a historian and scholar of English Tudor history. In 1959, he moved with his parents from England to Chicago, Illinois, when his father accepted a teaching job at the University of Chicago. Dewar attended the University of Chicago, earning a Bachelor of Science (B.S.) in 1964, and a Doctor of Philosophy (Ph.D.) in chemistry in 1968. He began to work with computers during graduate school.

== Career ==
Dewar was first Assistant Professor of Information Science and later Associate Professor of Computer Science at the Illinois Institute of Technology (IIT) from 1968 to 1975, before becoming Research Associate Professor of Computer Science at New York University (NYU) in 1975, where he was Full Professor of Computer Science from 1976 to 2005, and becoming chair of the department.

He was involved with developing international standards in programming and informatics, as a member of the International Federation for Information Processing (IFIP) IFIP Working Group 2.1 (WG 2.1) on Algorithmic Languages and Calculi, which specified, maintains, and supports the languages ALGOL 60 and ALGOL 68. He was involved in the design of ALGOL 68, and was WG 2.1 chairperson from 1978 to 1983.

He was associate director of the Courant Institute of Mathematical Sciences from 1994 to 1997. Until his death, he was president of AdaCore, which he cofounded in 1994, and served as its CEO until 2012. Dewar was an outspoken advocate of freely licensed open-source software and an expert in copyright and patent law for software. He was in demand as a speaker at conferences and expert witness in legal actions.

== Software contributions ==
While at the IIT, Dewar created the original SPITBOL compiler, with Ken Belcher in 1971, and Macro SPITBOL, with Tony McCann in 1974. These implementations of SNOBOL4, which quickly gained widespread popularity, are still being used today. In the 1980s, he was a principal author of the Realia COBOL compiler for the IBM PC, today marketed by Computer Associates, and still widely used in commercial environments.

Dewar became involved with the language Ada from its early days as a Distinguished Reviewer of the Ada 1983 design proposed by Jean Ichbiah that was selected by the United States Department of Defense (US DoD). He was codirector, with Edmond Schonberg, of the team at NYU that produced Ada/Ed, an interpreter for Ada 83 written in SETL and the first Ada implementation to pass the strenuous ACVC validation suite, mandated for being allowed to use the trademarked name Ada.

Dewar and Schonberg went on to produce GNAT, a free software compiler for Ada that forms part of the GNU Compiler Collection (GCC). Dewar also participated in the SETL project at NYU, and co-authored the handbook Programming With Sets: An Introduction to SETL. He influenced the design of the language ABC, in particular its SETL-style high-level data types, such as associative arrays. Guido van Rossum, the author of the language Python, wrote that the use of the colon in Python is due to Dewar's wife.

== Personal life ==
He was married to Karin Dewar, née Anderson (died 2013), and had two children, Jenny and Keith, and two grandchildren.

Dewar played the bassoon, recorder, and other musical instruments and enjoyed singing. He was an enthusiastic and valued member and benefactor of the Village Light Opera Group (VLOG) for 35 years, serving them in many capacities, from producer and president to music director, and on stage from Harem Guard to the title role in Gilbert and Sullivan's The Mikado. VLOG's Dewar Center for the Performing Arts was named in recognition of Robert and Karin Dewar's contributions. He was also a member of the North American Heckelphone Society and performed with other groups until only months before his death.

He died of cancer at age 70 at his home in Bennington, Vermont.

== Publications ==
- Dewar, Robert B. K. (June 1975). "Indirect Threaded Code". Communications of the ACM. 18 (6): 330–331. doi:10.1145/360825.360849. S2CID 26395264.
- Dewar, Robert B. K.; McCann, Anthony P. (1977). "Macro SPITBOL: a SNOBOL4 Compiler". Software: Practice and Experience. 7: 95–113. doi:10.1002/spe.4380070106. S2CID 29014301.
- Dewar, Robert B. K.; Golumbic, Martin Charles; Goss, Clinton F. (August 2013) [First published October 1979]. Macro SPITBOL. Computer Science Department Technical Report. Vol. 11. Courant Institute of Mathematical Sciences. arXiv:1308.6096. Bibcode:2013arXiv1308.6096D.
- Dewar, Robert B. K.; McCann, Anthony P. (1979). MINIMAL: A Machine Independent Assembly Language. Computer Science Department Technical Report. Vol. 12. Courant Institute of Mathematical Sciences.
- Golumbic, Martin Charles; Dewar, Robert B. K.; Goss, Clinton F. (1980). "Macro Substitutions in Macro SPITBOL – a Combinatorial Analysis". Proceedings of the 11th Southeastern Conference on Combinatorics, Graph Theory and Computing, Congressus Numerantium, Utilitas Math. 29. Winnipeg, Canada: 485–495.
- Schwartz, J. T.; Dewar, R. B. K.; Dubinsky, E.; Schonberg, E. (1986). Programming with Sets: An Introduction to SETL. Springer-Verlag. ISBN 0-387-96399-5.
- Dewar, Robert B. K.; Smosna, Matthew (1990). Microprocessors: A Programmer's View. McGraw-Hill. ISBN 978-0-07-016638-7.
- Dewar, Robert B. K. (2007). "The compiler as a static analysis tool". SIGAda 2007: 83–88.

== See also ==
- Realia Spacemaker (1982)
