= Harris Computer Systems =

American computing vendor

- Company type: Public
- Traded as: Nasdaq: NHWK
- Industry: Computer systems
- Founded: 1994; 32 years ago
- Fate: 1996, acquired by Concurrent Computer Corporation
- Headquarters: Fort Lauderdale, Florida, U.S.
- Key people: E. Courtney "Corky" Siegel
- Products: H-series; Night Hawk
- Revenue: $60 million (1994)
- Number of employees: 480 (1994)

Harris Computer Systems Corporation was an American computer company, in existence during the mid-1990s, that made real-time computing systems. Its products powered a variety of applications, including those for aerospace simulation, data acquisition and control, and signal processing. It was based in Fort Lauderdale, Florida. For twenty years prior, it had been the Harris Computer Systems Division of Harris Corporation, until being spun off as an independent company in 1994. Then in 1996, Harris Computer Systems Corporation itself was acquired by Concurrent Computer Corporation.

== Origins ==
The origins of Harris Computer Systems began in 1967 in Fort Lauderdale, Florida, when Datacraft Corporation was founded. It would specialize in minicomputers for the scientific engineering market and for educational use.

The best known of these were the DC-6024 line, which were based on a 24-bit computing architecture and debuted in 1969. Successive models were denoted with names such as DC-6024/1 and DC-6024/4, which became known as "Slash 1", "Slash 4", and so forth. The Slash 1 made cost-effective use of hardware for floating-point operations and quickly became popular as alternatives to computers from Systems Engineering Laboratories.

== Harris Computer Systems Division ==
In 1974, Harris Corporation acquired Datacraft, which led to the formation of the Harris Computer Systems Division. Some of the later "Slash" systems were sold under the Harris name.

=== H-series ===
The Harris Computer Systems Division then came out with the H-Series product line, which featured virtual memory as a key aspect. It remained one of the few 24-bit computers available at the time. Such models included the H80 and H100 minicomputers. Like other Harris Computer systems, these were geared towards multiple-processing jobs and real-time environments. H-series products were generally good at maintaining binary compatibility, meaning old application executables could still run on newer models. Later models included the H800 and H1200.

The operating system for the H-Series was called Vulcan, which around 1982 started being replaced by one called VOS. The H-series systems typically had support for a number of different programming languages, including Fortran, COBOL, Pascal, BASIC, APL, SNOBOL, RPG, and assembly language. In addition, as a company involved in defense-related contracts, Harris Computer Systems Division came out with a line of Ada programming language compiler products.

=== OS support ===
In 1984, Harris Computer made its first forays into having VOS co-exist alongside the Unix operating system. As Harris left 24-bit systems and moved to 32-bit architectures, Vulcan and VOS fell by the wayside and Unix-based ones took over.

In this fashion, Harris Computer offered three operating systems: CX/RT, built around real-time processing features and constraints; CX/SX, for customers needing government-specified levels of security, and CX/UX, for a system offering a Unix basis. The three CX variants shared the same object and file formats and could reside on the same disk drive as each other.

The secure version of Unix was popular among some government contracts where security was a primary consideration. In particular, CX/SX reached B1 Orange Book and B1 Red Book status in the U.S. government's Trusted Computer System Evaluation Criteria.

=== Night Hawk series ===
By the late 1980s/early 1990s, the major product of Harris Computer Systems Division was the Night Hawk series of real-time systems.

In 1989, the first Night Hawk systems based on the Motorola 88000 processor line came out. The systems were mainly targeted for the real-time domain, including aerospace simulation, signal processing, and C^{3}I uses. Night Hawk models included the NH-1200, NH-3400, NH-4400, NH-4800, and NH-5800. Then in 1992, Harris announced it was switching to the PowerPC architecture.

The Harris Computer Systems Division also made a network firewall product, that they sold to their governmental agency customers. E. Courtney "Corky" Siegel was general manager of the division.

== Harris Computer Systems Corporation ==
On October 7, 1994, Harris Computer Systems Corporation came into being, as a spinoff to Harris Corporation shareholders. There were some 480 employees who joined the new enterprise. It had revenues of about $60 million, and had earned about $2 million over the year prior. Said John Hartley, the head of Harris Corporation: "This is a well-established, profitable business that we believe will best realize its full potential as a stand-alone public corporation." The CEO of the new company was Siegel, who said "this move will give the new company greater access to capital markets for future growth."

The new company's business focus was on systems for real-time simulation and simulation for training and for data acquisition and control. An additional focus was on secure systems. Its headquarters were those of the division prior, being in Fort Lauderdale, Florida.

The company's main product was (continued to be) the Night Hawk computer system, which featured high performance, multi-processing, and real-time capabilities. Accordingly, it was intended for high-performance, real-time applications in both the government and commercial sectors. Night Hawk was especially strong in the flight simulator market. The main competitor of Harris Computer Systems Corporation was Concurrent Computer Corporation of Monmouth County, New Jersey. A secondary competitor was Encore Computer of Massachusetts.

During 1994 to 1995, Harris Computer also garnered some large aviation and telecommunications contracts in the civilian world. At the same time, Harris Computer Systems introduced a product for network security called CyberGuard, whose purpose was to protect systems against unauthorized incursion over the Internet.

Harris Computer Systems continued to be involved in the Ada language world. In addition to compilers, the company put out APSE-related runtime environments with symbolic debugging and tracing capabilities. During the mid-1990s, Harris Computer Systems was also involved in the process for revising the Ada Semantic Interface Specification.

== Acquisition ==
In March 1995, Harris Computer Systems, led by CEO Siegel, looked to buy Concurrent Computer Corporation, its main competitor, but the discussions tripped over business, legal, and cultural issues and ended in acrimony.

Negotiations resumed late in the year, albeit in the opposite direction, and in June 1996, Concurrent acquired the high-performance computer business of Harris Computer Systems.

However, the corporate headquarters was moved from New Jersey to Harris's location of Fort Lauderdale, Florida. Harris Computer Systems' Siegel was named CEO of Concurrent Computer, while existing Concurrent CEO was made chair of the board of directors. While in theory the best components of each company would be the ones moving forward, in practice it was the PowerPC-based Night Hawk business that mostly continued, while Concurrent's own product, based on a different processor, was de-emphasized. As a result, the offices in New Jersey gradually all but disappeared.

The CyberGuard network security business was not included in the deal, and indeed what remained of Harris Computer Systems Corporation after the Concurrent acquisition renamed itself to the CyberGuard Corporation.
