= Netco =

Netco or NETCO is the name or acronym for several companies and products

- N.E. Thing Co., a Canadian art collective from 1967-78
- Netco Government Services, a network infrastructure company in the United States
- Netco (Somalia), a telecommunications company in Somalia
