= Ravenscar =

Ravenscar may refer to:

- Ravenscar, North Yorkshire
- Ravenscar railway station, in Ravenscar, North Yorkshire
- Ravenscar profile, a subset of the Ada programming language designed for safety-critical real-time computing
- Roger Comstock, Marquis of Ravenscar, a character in Neal Stephenson's The Baroque Cycle
