= Multimax =

Multimax may refer to:

- Multimax, parallel computer from Encore Computer, released in 1985
- MultiMAX, trailers for oversize load transportation made by the Faymonville Group
- Multimax, Air Force contractor acquired by Netco Government Services

== See also ==
- Minimax
