= TLD Systems =

US software company for embedded systems

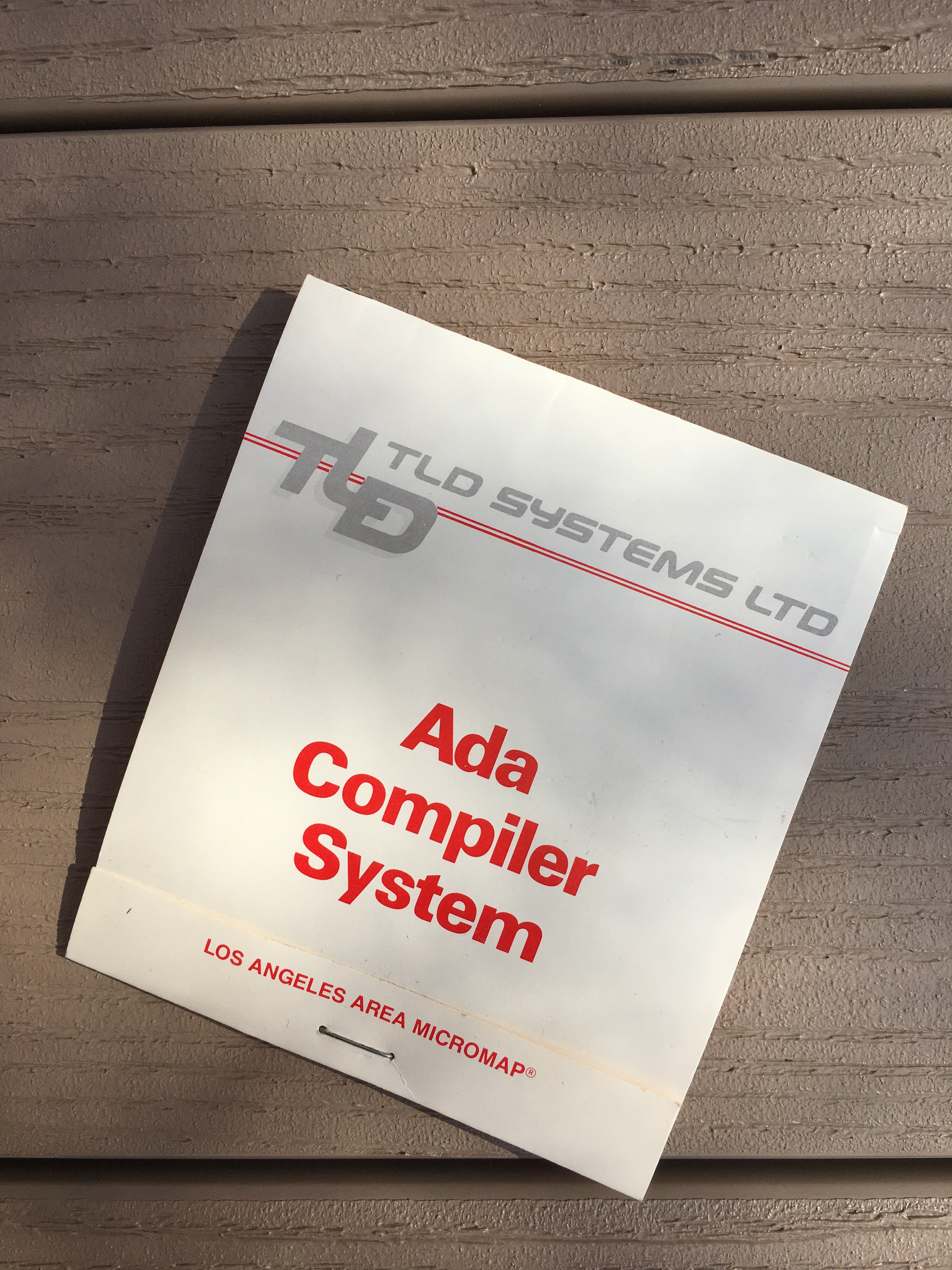
Promotional "matchbook" from TLD Systems, actually containing a map of their Los Angeles area

TLD Systems, Ltd. was an American software company active in the 1980s and 1990s and based in Torrance, California, that specialized in language compilers for the JOVIAL and Ada programming languages that were targeted to embedded systems.

TLD was founded by Terry L. Dunbar in 1982 and carried his initials. It was based on work on JOVIAL compilers he did at Computer Sciences Corporation and Software Engineering Associates, Inc. in the 1970s.

Over the years TLD developed a reputation for experience with, and in-depth knowledge of, both the JOVIAL language and the MIL-STD-1750A architecture that was popular for U.S. Air Force projects. TLD hosted its JOVIAL cross-compiler, and several associated tools such as an assembler, linker, simulator, and symbolic debugger, on several platforms including VAX/VMS and later Sun SPARC/SunOS.

TLD then entered the new market for the Ada programming language, which the U.S. Department of Defense had designated as the successor to JOVIAL and other special-purpose languages in use by the military. TLD made embedded system Ada cross compilers targeting the MIL-STD-1750A, hosted on VAX/VMS as well as several Unix-based platforms. The Ada compilers shared the same associated tools as the JOVIAL product. TLD also made a native Ada compiler for the Data General MV/32 20000 under AOS/VS II.

The Ada software environment was originally thought to be a promising market, with a number of small, new companies seeking to gain a foothold in it. But the Ada compiler business proved to be a difficult one to be in; many of the advantages of the language for general-purpose programming were not seen as such by the general software engineering community or by educators. TLD Systems was still actively marketing its Ada and JOVIAL products up through 1995.

Faced with the need to conform to the new Ada 95 standard for the language, in late 1995 TLD announced a joint arrangement with Ada Core Technologies in which that firm's Ada technology would be adapted to work with TLD's other cross-development tools.

TLD Systems ceased doing business as such in 1998. Following that a small consulting firm named TLDworks, Inc. came into being with an address in Hermosa Beach, California.
