= Surinder Kumar =

Surinder Kumar may refer to:

- Surinder Kumar (academic)
- Surinder Kumar (politician)
