= Spectrum Signal Processing by Vecima =

- Type: Business Division
- Industry: Hardware; Electronics
- Founded: 1987
- Headquarters: Burnaby, British Columbia
- Area served: Worldwide
- Key people: Mark Briggs (GM); Tudor Davies (Director of Product Management); Larry Wardrop (Director of Sales)
- Products: embedded I/O modules; software defined radio
- Number of employees: 40-50 (2013)

Spectrum Signal Processing by Vecima is a technology company and commercial off-the-shelf (COTS) product provider, based in Vancouver, British Columbia. Spectrum designs and builds board and system-level hardware and software for signal processing applications. Since May 2, 2007, Spectrum has operated as a division of Vecima Networks Inc., a Canadian technology company. In addition, Spectrum Signal Processing (USA), Inc. is a subsidiary of Vecima Networks Inc., and is primarily a sales organization for Spectrum's products in the United States.

== History ==
=== 1987 ===
Spectrum Signal Processing is founded.

=== 2007 ===
Spectrum Signal Processing is acquired by Vecima Networks Inc., became Spectrum Signal Processing by Vecima.

== Products and Services ==
Spectrum designs and builds I/O modules (RF, analog and digital I/O) and integrated software-reconfigurable platforms for customer applications such as software-defined radio (SDR), Intelligence, Surveillance and Reconnaissance (ISR); military communications (MILCOM), satellite communications (SATCOM), Datalinks, and radar. Spectrum's products are designed and manufactured in Burnaby, British Columbia, Canada.

=== Hardware ===
Spectrum provides RF, signal processing engines, analog and digital I/O modules, along with integrated systems and subsystems, in CompactPCI (cPCI), PCI Express (PCIe), VME, XMC/PMC, AMC and VPX form factors.

== See also ==
- Canadian companies
