= Straw man proposal =

Business term

A straw-man proposal (alternatively straw-dog or straw-person) is a brainstormed simple draft proposal intended to generate discussion of its disadvantages and to spur the generation of new and better proposals. The term is considered American business jargon, but it is also encountered in engineering office culture.

Often, a straw man document will be prepared by one or two people prior to kicking off a larger project. In this way, the team can jump start their discussions with a document that is likely to contain many, but not all, of the key aspects to be discussed. As the document is revised, it may be given other edition names such as the more solid-sounding "stone-man", "iron-man", and so on.

== Origins ==
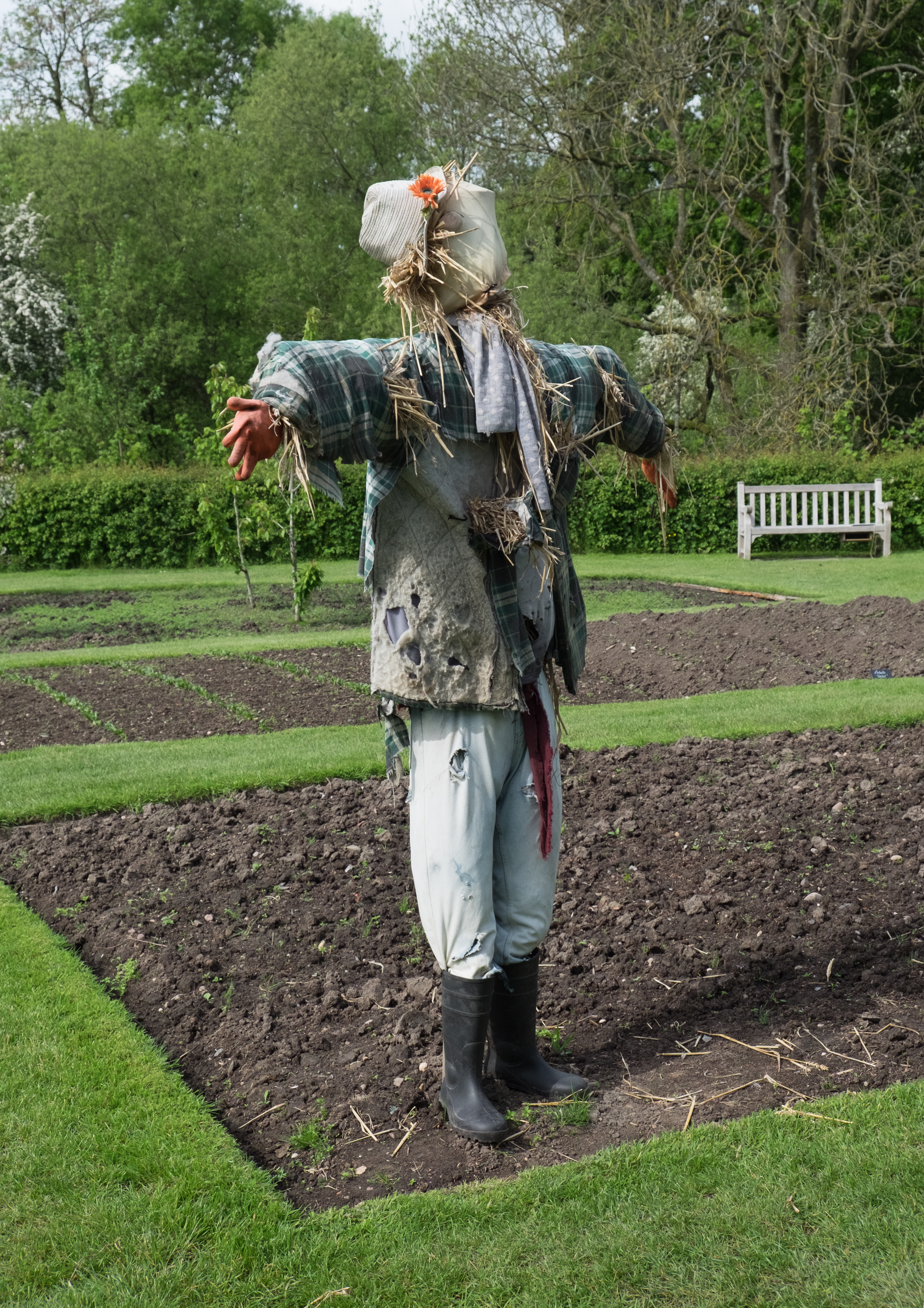
A scarecrow stuffed with straw

The name refers to the concept of a straw man, a constructed human figure stuffed with straw.

The expression was already in use in the United States Department of Defense circa 1975 in their Large Organization Model Building paradigm (LOMB) and was apparently in use with this meaning (initial proposal) in the United States Air Force before that. The succession of names comes from the requirements document for the programming language Ada. In the High Order Language Working Group (HOLWG) the process to define Ada generated requirements documents sporting different names, representing the various stages of development of the Ada language, as described in 1993 by Col William Whitaker in an article ACM SIGPLAN Notices. They are:

- STRAWMAN issued in April 1975
- WOODENMAN issued in August 1975
- TINMAN issued in January 1976
- IRONMAN issued in January 1977 (revised in July 1977)
- SANDMAN not published but circulated in January 1978
- STEELMAN issued in June 1978
- PEBBLEMAN issued in July 1978
- PEBBLEMAN Revised and issued in January 1979
- STONEMAN issued in February 1980

Other references include "The Ada Environment", LTC Rodney A. Edge, Walter Reed Army Institute of Research, Washington, DC 20307, Thomas A. Marciniak, M.D., National Cancer Institute, Bethesda, MD 20205

== Software development ==
In software development, a crude plan or document may serve as the strawman or starting point in the evolution of a project. The strawman is not expected to be the last word; it is refined until a final model or document is obtained that resolves all issues concerning the scope and nature of the project. In this context, a strawman can take the form of an outline, a set of charts, a presentation, or a paper.

The ‘Straw Man’ also fits in neatly with the concept of iterative design, repeating and re-drafting to improve an initial concept or design. If anything is built, often, it may not end up in the final product. It might be that the decision is to not continue at all, in which case, the ‘Straw Man’ approach may have saved a lot of wasted work in the long run. Or, the final approach may be very different from the first model. Either way, the ‘Straw Man’ will have proven its worth by having re-directed the approach before any significant work is undertaken.

== See also ==
- Stalking horse – Figure used to test an idea for a third party
- Straw man – Form of incorrect argument and informal fallacy
- Aunt Sally – Traditional English pub game
