= Vecima Networks =

Canadian telecommunications equipment company

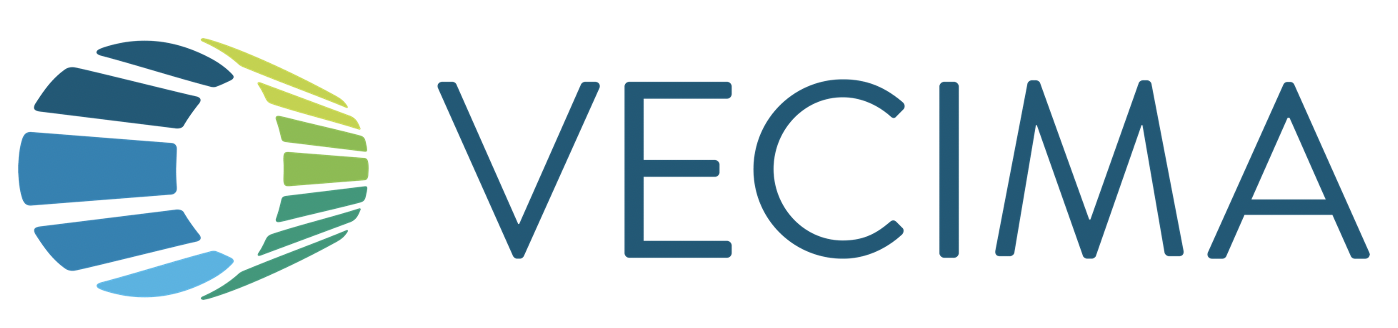
- Company type: Public (TSX: VCM)
- Industry: Telecommunications, telematics equipment
- Founded: 1988
- Headquarters: Victoria, British Columbia, Canada
- Area served: Worldwide
- Key people: Sumit Kumar (CEO & President), Surinder Kumar (Chairman), Judd Schmid (CFO)
- Products: Distributed access architecture, video processing, content delivery networks, telematics
- Number of employees: 377 (June 2020)
- Website: vecima.com

Vecima Networks is a Canadian company that develops hardware and software for broadband access, content delivery, and telematics. It was founded in Saskatoon, Saskatchewan, and currently has offices in Saskatoon, Burnaby, Atlanta, London, Amsterdam, Tokyo, and is headquartered in Victoria. Vecima sells its products to original equipment manufacturers (OEMs), system integrators, MSOs and other service providers.

Sumit Kumar is the CEO and president. Surinder Kumar is the founder of the company and is the chairman of the board.

== History ==
In 1988 Wavecom Electronics was founded and incorporated by Surinder Kumar. In 1990, the first commercial products included a line of modulators for the cable television industry. In 1998, Wavecom relocated its corporate headquarters to Victoria.

In 2003, Wavecom changed the company name to VCom.

In 2005, VCom transitioned to a public company – VCM on the TSX. In the same year, VCom wins the Advancing Technology award at BC Export Awards.

In 2006 VCom changed its name to Vecima Networks. In December 2008, Vecima signed a supply agreement with Cisco Systems.

In 2013, Vecima announced the appointment of Sumit Kumar to position of CEO.

In 2017, Vecima sold YourLink to Xplornet.

== Acquisitions ==
In 2003, VCom acquired YourLink, a wireless service provider.

In 2007, Vecima acquired Spectrum Signal Processing (Burnaby), a signal processing hardware company.

In 2016, Vecima acquired Contigo Systems, a telematics company.

In 2017, Vecima acquired Concurrent Computer Corporation, a video content delivery and storage company.
