= Verdix =

Verdix Corporation
- Company type: public
- Industry: software
- Founded: 1982; 43 years ago
- Founder: George Cowan; Donn Milton
- Defunct: 1994; 31 years ago
- Fate: acquired by Rational Software
- Successor: Rational Software
- Headquarters: Fairfax County, Virginia

Verdix Corporation was an American software company active in the 1980s and 1990s and based in Fairfax County, Virginia, that specialized in language compilers for the Ada programming language.

Verdix was founded in 1982 by George Cowan and Donn Milton. It became a public company in 1983. Cohen served as its CEO and chair while Milton managed the company's Ada Products Division. Its initial offices were in McLean, Virginia but it subsequently moved to Chantilly and then Herndon, all within Fairfax County in northern Virginia.

The Verdix Ada Development System (VADS) provided a set of tools for software developers who create complex systems. It included an Ada compiler, a visual debugger, a library management system, and an efficient runtime system. VADS was sold in several configurations:

- VADS self: For self-hosted systems running on workstations
- VADScross: For applications embedded in microprocessors
- VADSworks: For networked microprocessor applications providing critical communications and efficiency
- VADSpro: A complete configuration management system integrated with IDE OODSA/Ada, SART (automated reasoning tools), and Interleaf
- VADS APSE: VADSpro plus tools for developing CASE applications
- VSLAN (Verdix Secure Local Area Network): For developers working in highly secure environments

The company achieved its first official validated Ada compiler in January 1985. Verdix became known for the large number of Ada compilers it offered on many different systems, selling both native compilers and cross-compilers for embedded systems architectures. By 1992 Verdix had 105 different Ada compilers on the Ada Joint Program Office validated compilers list, easily the most of any Ada vendor (next highest was Alsys with 60). Its revenues were around $13 million.

The Ada software environment was originally thought to be a promising market, with a number of small, new companies including Verdix seeking to gain a foothold in it. But the Ada compiler business proved to be a difficult one to be in; many of the advantages of the language for general-purpose programming were not seen as such by the general software engineering community or by educators. Consolidations happened within the Ada software tools industry. In 1991 Verix bought Meridian Software Systems, another Ada compiler company. In 1994, Verdix itself was acquired by Rational Software.
