= Asher A. Friesem =

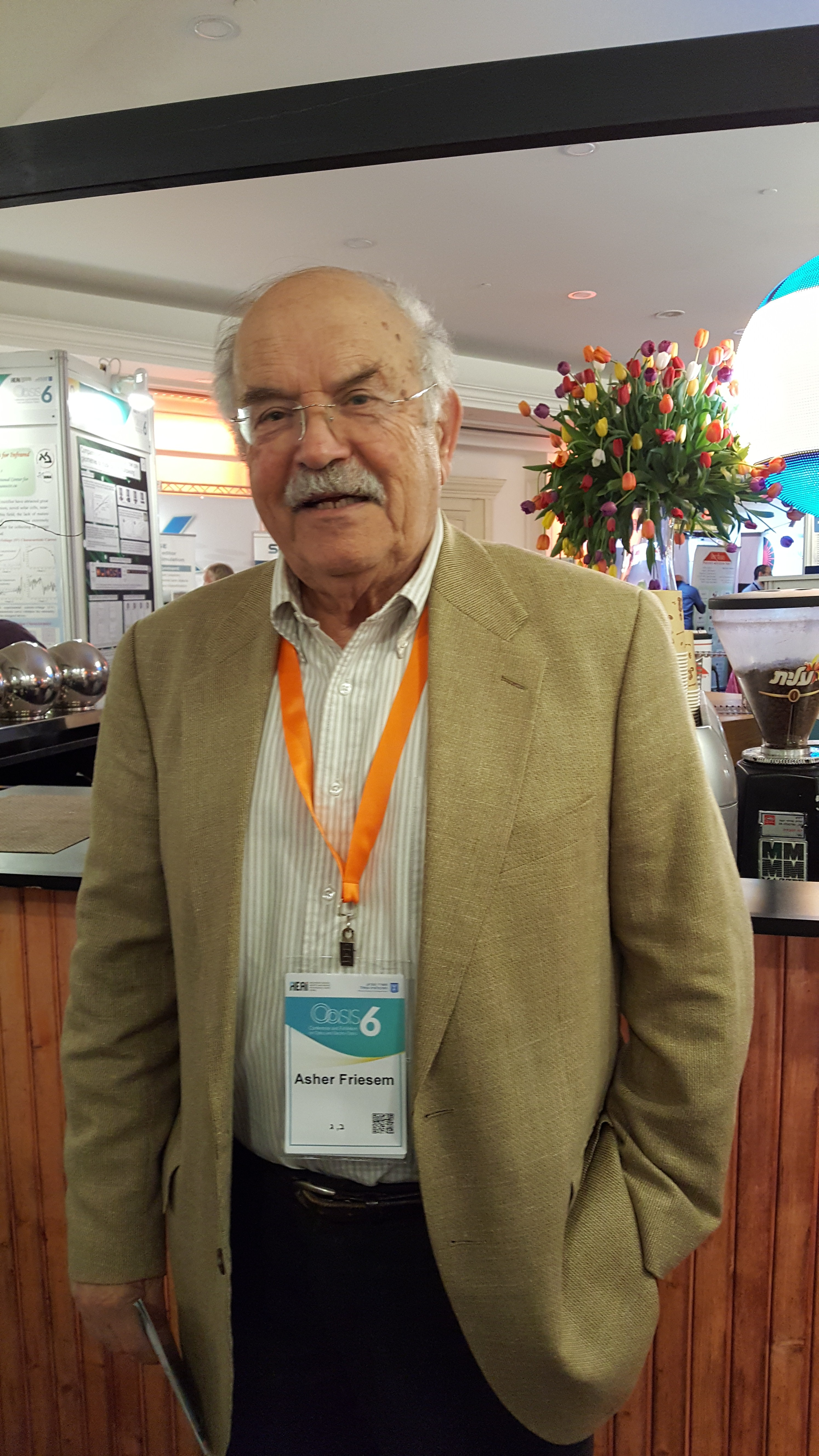
Prof. Asher Friesem, 2017

Asher A. Friesem (Hebrew: אשר פריזם) is a professor at the Weizmann Institute of Science in Israel.

Friesem received B.Sc. and Ph.D. degrees from the University of Michigan in 1958 and 1968, respectively. From 1958 to 1963 he was employed by Bell Aero Systems Company and Bendix Research Laboratories. From 1963 to 1969, at the University of Michigan’s Institutes of Science and Technology, he conducted investigations in coherent optics, mainly in the areas of optical data processing and holography. From 1969 to 1973, he was principal research engineer in the Electro-Optics Center of Harris, Inc., performing research in the areas of optical memories and displays.

In 1973 he joined the staff of the Weizmann Institute of Science, Israel and was appointed professor of optical sciences in 1977. He subsequently served as department head, chairman of the scientific council, and chairman of the professorial council. In recent years his research activities have concentrated on new holographic concepts and applications, optical image processing, electro-optic devices, and new laser resonator configurations.

He has served on numerous program and advisory committees of national and international conferences. Among other posts, he served for many years as a vice president of the International Commission of Optics (ICO) and chairman of the Israel Laser and Electro-Optics Society. He is a fellow of OSA, a life fellow of IEEE, and member of SPIE and Sigma Xi. In 2018, he received the Emmett N. Leith Medal, "For pioneering, seminal and wide ranging contributions to coherent optics, particularly the developments of new techniques and procedures in holographic applications and optical information processing." Over the years he has been a visiting professor in Germany, Switzerland, France and the U.S., has authored and co-authored more than 250 scientific papers, co-editor of four scientific volumes, and holds over 30 international patents.

He made the first full-color hologram.
