= MASSCOMP =

Former computer manufacturer from the United States

MASSCOMP logo.

The Massachusetts Computer Corporation (MASSCOMP) was a computer manufacturer based in Westford, Massachusetts. Originally conceived by C. Forbes Dewey of MIT and inventor Chester Schuler, it was founded formally in 1981. Its target market was real-time computing, with a focus on high-speed data acquisition. Its major innovation was that it created the first widely available computer product which was able to sample analog signals at one million samples per second and store the resulting data to disk continuously. Given the technology available at the time—Motorola 68000 series CPUs of only a few megahertz in speed and slow disk drives—this product represented quite a technological achievement.

The MASSCOMP MC-500 is a 68000-based microcomputer running a real-time variant of the Unix operating system. For a small company, MASSCOMP incorporated a number of ambitious and innovative projects in addition to Real-Time Unix, including its own C and Fortran compiler, a block diagram language known as "Laboratory Workbench" that allowed visual programming of real time systems to connect real-time analog inputs and outputs to signal processing operations and interactive virtual instruments for data display, and its own high level graphics subsystem.

MASSCOMP grew to about $65 million in sales per year and ultimately purchased Concurrent Computer Corporation (a spinoff company that was part public but majority-owned by Perkin-Elmer) in 1988 in a "junk bond deal" and assumed the Concurrent name, with aim of becoming the number one vendor in the real-time computing market. The deal cost Masscomp $240 million. Perkin-Elmer sold this company as part of restructuring of its business due to low profits in the computer market.
