= Surinder Kumar (academic) =

Surinder Kumar is an academic and entrepreneur. He was a professor and holder of the Natural Science and Engineering Research Council's Industrial Chair in Telecommunications at the University of Saskatchewan from 1987 to 1997, President and chief executive officer of Vecima networks.

From 1982 to 1987, Kumar was Vice President of Research for SED Systems where he was involved in the design of a variety of satellite earth stations. Prior to 1982, he worked with a government research laboratory in India. Dr Kumar received his Bachelor of Engineering degree in electrical communication engineering in 1967 from the Indian Institute of Science, Bangalore, India and his Masters of Technology degree from the Indian Institute of Technology, Kanpur, India in 1971. He received his PhD in Electronics Engineering from Carleton University, Ottawa, Ontario, Canada where he was a Commonwealth Scholar. Dr Kumar was named 1998 Entrepreneur of the Year for Western Canada and 2005 Entrepreneur of the Year for the Pacific Region in Information Technology.

Kumar is an expert in microwave engineering and has a number of patents and papers in this area. Kumar is listed in Who's Who in America (Marquis), Who's Who in Canada, Who's Who Amongst Business Executives. He conducts market and technical research in the microwave communications area and is heading the Vecima Networks Microwave Research Laboratory in Victoria, British Columbia.
