= ABC (programming language) =

Programming language

- Paradigms: multi-paradigm: imperative, procedural, structured
- Designed by: Leo Geurts, Lambert Meertens, Steven Pemberton
- Developer: Centrum Wiskunde & Informatica (CWI)
- First appeared: January 1987; 38 years ago
- Stable release: 1.05.02 / 1990; 35 years ago
- Typing discipline: strong, polymorphic
- OS: Unix-like, Windows, MacOS, and Atari TOS
- Website: homepages.cwi.nl/~steven/abc/

Influenced by
- SETL, ALGOL 68

Influenced
- Python

ABC is an imperative general-purpose programming language and integrated development environment (IDE) developed at Centrum Wiskunde & Informatica (CWI), in Amsterdam, Netherlands by Leo Geurts, Lambert Meertens, and Steven Pemberton. It is interactive, structured, high-level, and intended to be used instead of BASIC, Pascal, or AWK. It is intended for teaching or prototyping, but not as a systems-programming language. ABC was developed from the B language, an earlier creation by Meertens and Pemberton (unrelated to Thompson and Ritchie's language of the same name) which was the first language to use indentation for block structure.

ABC had a major influence on the design of the Python language, whose creator, Guido van Rossum, had worked for several years on the ABC system in the mid-1980s.

== Features ==
Its designers claim that ABC programs are typically around a quarter the size of the equivalent Pascal or C programs, and more readable. Key features include:

- Only five basic data types
- No required variable declarations
- Explicit support for top-down programming
- Statement nesting is indicated by indentation, via the off-side rule
- Infinite precision arithmetic, unlimited-sized lists and strings, and other features supporting orthogonality and ease of use by novices
- Polymorphic commands and functions
- Interactive environment with command completion, persistent workspaces, and no separate file handling

ABC was originally a monolithic implementation, leading to an inability to adapt to new requirements, such as creating a graphical user interface (GUI). ABC could not directly access the underlying file system and operating system.

The full ABC system includes a programming environment with a structure editor (syntax-directed editor), suggestions, static variables (persistent), and multiple workspaces, and is available as an interpreter–compiler. As of 2020, the latest version is 1.05.02, for Unix, MS-DOS, Atari ST, and MacOS.

== Example ==
An example function to collect the set of all words in a document:

HOW TO RETURN words document:
   PUT {} IN collection
   FOR line IN document:
      FOR word IN split line:
         IF word not.in collection:
            INSERT word IN collection
   RETURN collection

== Implementations ==
ABC has been through multiple iterations, with the current version being the 4th major release. Implementations exist for Unix-like systems, MS-DOS/Windows, Macintosh, and other platforms. The source code was made available via Usenet in the late 1980s/early 1990s.
