= GNAT =

Free-software compiler for the Ada programming language

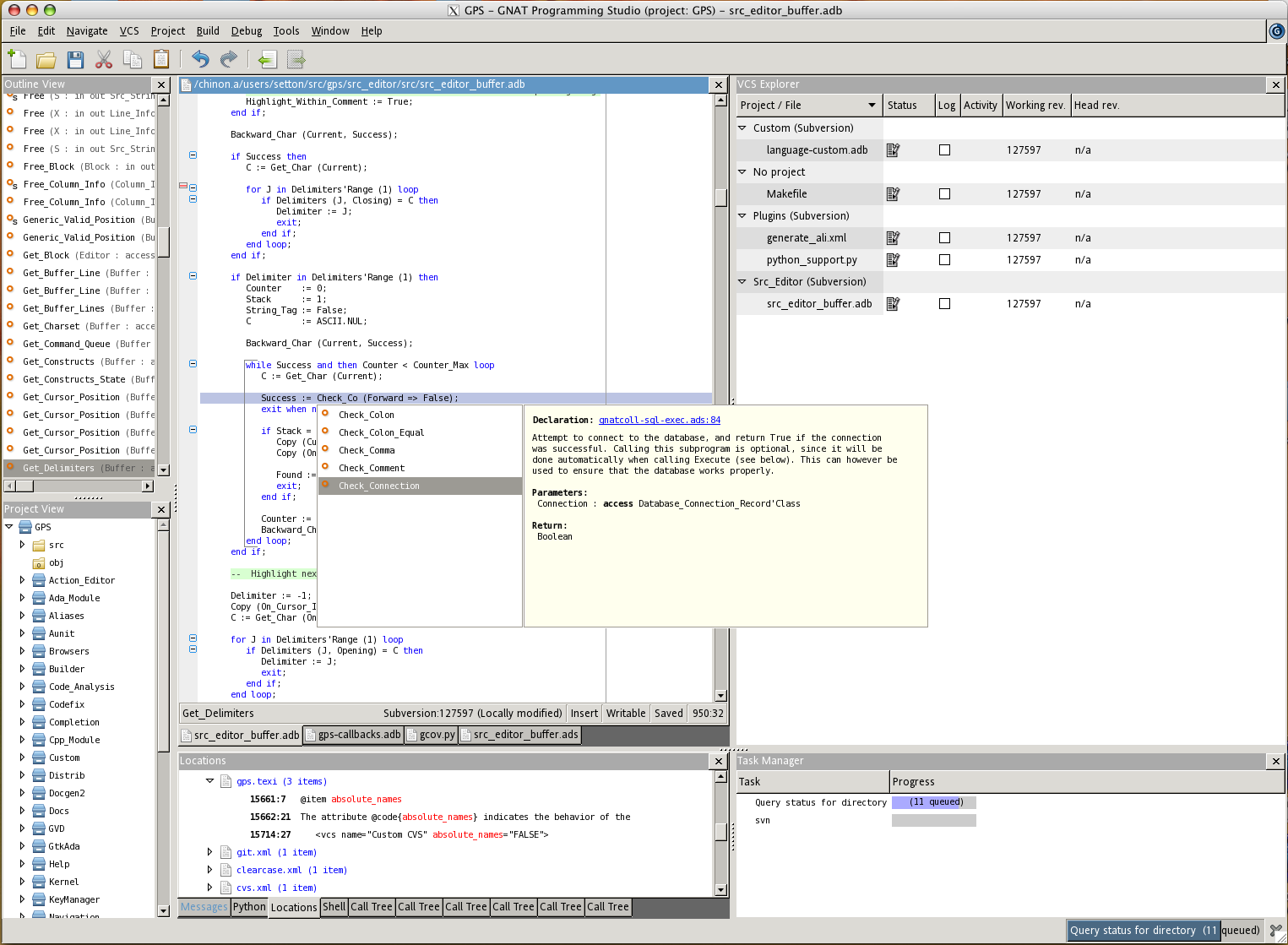
- Ada source within GPS
- Developers: New York University (NYU), AdaCore and the GNU Project
- Release: 1995; 31 years ago
- Stable release: FSF GNAT 14.1 (2024-05-07) GNAT Pro 24 (2024)
- Operating system: FreeBSD, Linux, Solaris/SPARC, Microsoft Windows, Mac OS X, plus others as supported by FSF GNAT within GCC
- Type: Compiler
- License: GNU GPL 3+ with GCC Runtime Library Exception
- Website: www.gnu.org/software/gnat/ - FSF GNAT www.adacore.com/gnatpro/ GNAT Pro

GNAT is a free-software compiler for the Ada programming language which forms part of the GNU Compiler Collection (GCC). It supports all versions of the language, i.e. Ada 2012, Ada 2005, Ada 95 and Ada 83. Originally its name was an acronym that stood for GNU NYU Ada Translator, but that name no longer applies. The front-end and run-time are written in Ada.

== History ==
The GNAT project started in 1992 when the United States Air Force awarded New York University (NYU) a contract to build a free compiler for Ada to help with the Ada 9X standardization process. The 3-million-dollar contract required the use of the GNU GPL for all development, and assigned the copyright to the Free Software Foundation. The first official validation of GNAT occurred in 1995.

In 1994 and 1996, the original authors of GNAT Robert Dewar and Edmond Schonberg founded two sister companies, Ada Core Technologies in New York City and ACT-Europe (later AdaCore SAS) in Paris, to provide continuing development and commercial support of GNAT. The two companies always operated as one entity, but did not formally unify until 2012 as AdaCore.

GNAT was initially released separately from the main GCC sources. On October 2, 2001, the GNAT sources were contributed to the GCC CVS repository. The last version to be released separately was GNAT 3.15p, based on GCC 2.8.1, on October 2, 2002. Starting with GCC 3.4, on major platforms the official GCC release is able to pass 100% of the ACATS Ada tests included in the GCC testsuite. By GCC 4.0, more exotic platforms were also able to pass 100% of the ACATS tests.

== License ==
The compiler is licensed under the terms of the GNU GPL 3+ with GCC Runtime Library Exception.

All versions leading up to and including 3.15p are licensed under the GMGPL offering similar runtime exceptions. The GMGPL license is GNU GPL 2 with a linking exception that permits software with licenses that are incompatible with the GPL to be linked with the output of Ada standard generic libraries that are supplied with GNAT without breaching the license agreement.

== Versions ==
FSF GNAT is part of most major Linux or BSD distributions and is included in the main GCC Sources.

GNAT Pro is a supported version of GNAT from AdaCore.

In addition to FSF GNAT and AdaCore's GNAT Pro, AdaCore releases additional versions (GNAT-GPL, a public older version of GNAT Pro, and GNAT GAP, a version for AdaCore's educational programs). These AdaCore versions have the runtime exceptions removed, this requires software that is linked with the standard libraries to have GPL-compatible licenses to avoid being in breach of the license agreement.

JGNAT was a GNAT version that compiled from the Ada programming language to Java bytecode. GNAT for dotNET is a GNAT version that compiles from the Ada programming language to Common Language Infrastructure for the .NET Framework and the free and open source implementations Mono and Portable.NET.

== See also ==
- APSE – a specification for a programming environment to support software development in Ada
- GNU Compiler Collection – Free and open-source compiler for various programming languages
- Ravenscar profile – a subset of the Ada tasking features designed for safety-critical hard real-time computing
- SPARK – a programming language consisting of a highly restricted subset of Ada, annotated with meta-information describing desired component behavior and individual runtime requirements
