= AdaCore =

Software company

- Type: Private
- Founded: 1994
- Founders: Cyrille Comar; Robert Dewar; Franco Gasperoni; Richard Kenner; Edmond Schonberg
- Headquarters: New York and Paris
- Products: GNAT Pro; SPARK Pro; GNAT Pro for C/C++; GNAT Pro for Rust; GNAT Dynamic Analysis Suite; GNAT Static Analysis Suite; CodeSonar
- Owner: Battery Ventures
- Number of employees: 200 (2026)
- Website: adacore.com

AdaCore is a privately held software company that develops programming tools for high-integrity systems in Ada, SPARK, C/C++, and Rust. Headquartered in New York City and Paris, the company was founded in 1994 and supplies development and verification tools used in the aerospace, defense, automotive, rail, and medical device industries.

== History ==
AdaCore's origins lie in an academic project at New York University that began around 1980, when concerns about whether the newly designed Ada language was implementable led the US Air Force to a contract to NYU to build an executable definition of it. The resulting Ada/Ed system, an interpreter written in the high-level set-theoretic language SETL, served as an operational definition of Ada 83.

When Ada underwent its first major revision (Ada 9X, which became Ada 95), the NYU team received a contract from the US Air Force to prototype the new language features and give feedback to the design team, then led by Tucker Taft. This was to be a compiler, not an interpreter. The GNAT project started in 1992; the contract required the GNU General Public License for all development. GNAT, the GNU NYU Ada Translator, was an Ada front-end for the GNU Compiler Collection (GCC) compiler suite. The front-end was developed by the New York University team led by Robert Dewar and Edmond Schonberg, while a Florida State University team under Theodore Baker designed the original concurrency components of the runtime. Richard Kenner was the main author of “Gigi”, the GNAT to GNU interface that sat between the Ada components of the front end and GCC.

In August 1994, members of the NYU team created Ada Core Technologies, Inc. in New York, founded by Dewar, Schonberg, and Kenner, launching with a contract in hand from Silicon Graphics. A Paris-based sister company, ACT Europe, was founded soon after, and led by Cyrille Comar and Franco Gasperoni, to serve the European market. The two companies become one company officially in 2012, but had been operating as one earlier.

Over the following decades, the product line expanded beyond the compiler. The two companies jointly launched the GNAT Programming System (GPS) IDE, later renamed GNAT Studio. In 2004, AdaCore created the GNAT Academic Program (GAP) to encourage Ada in university curricula. In January 2012, AdaCore merged with SofCheck, Inc., the Massachusetts company founded by Ada 95 lead designer Tucker Taft; the two had previously co-developed the CodePeer static analysis tool based on SofCheck Inspector, and Taft joined AdaCore as Director of Language Research. Dewar served as CEO until 2012 and as President until his death from cancer on June 30, 2015.

On February 1, 2021, AdaCore acquired Componolit GmbH, a Dresden-based provider of formal verification tools for trusted systems, whose RecordFlux technology formally describes, tests, and implements binary communication protocols. The company also broadened its language focus: it partnered with Altran (now Capgemini Engineering) to extend Ada to the formally verifiable SPARK variant of Ada, C and C++, and partnered with Ferrous Systems to bring safety-certified Rust toolchains to market, joining the Rust Foundation in 2023 and jointly producing the Ferrocene Language Specification. The partnership ended in 2023, with AdaCore releasing its own Rust product, GNAT Pro for Rust and Ferrous Systems continuing Ferrocene independently.

In March 2024, Battery Ventures acquired a majority stake in AdaCore. The transaction was structured as a growth recapitalization and added Battery executive Robbie Payne to AdaCore's board with Franco Gasperoni continuing as CEO.

In June 2025, AdaCore and CodeSecure announced a merger agreement; CodeSecure was formed in 2023 when Battery Ventures acquired GrammaTech's software products division, including the CodeSonar and CodeSentry product lines. The combined company operates under the AdaCore brand with headquarters in Paris and New York, with Franco Gasperoni as CEO.

== Markets ==
AdaCore’s tools are used in the development of software for commercial avionics, military systems, space, air traffic management, automotive systems, rail signaling, and medical devices. These systems often require safety or security certification against functional safety standards such as DO-178C, EN 50128, ISO 26262, IEC 61508 and others. In 2019, NVIDIA announced it was working with AdaCore to use Ada and SPARK in security-critical firmware for its system-on-a-chip products, including autonomous driving applications targeting ISO 26262 compliance.

== Open-source contributions ==
AdaCore products are based on open source toolchains; the company contributed the GNAT front end to GCC in 2001 and employs maintainers of GDB and sponsors the Alire project.
