= Harris Corporation =

American industrial company

- Industry: Aerospace and defense
- Founded: 1895; 131 years ago
- Founder: Alfred S. Harris
- Defunct: June 28, 2019; 7 years ago
- Fate: Merged with L3 Technologies
- Successor: L3Harris Technologies
- Headquarters: Melbourne, Florida, U.S.
- Key people: William M. Brown, Chairman, (president & CEO since November 1, 2011)
- Products: Defense and Communications
- Revenue: US$4.936 billion (2019); US$4.507 billion (2018)
- Number of employees: 17,000 (2017)
- Divisions: Communication Systems, Electronic Systems, Space and Intelligence Systems
- Website: harris.com

Harris Corporation was an American technology company, defense contractor, and information technology services provider that produced wireless equipment, tactical radios, electronic systems, night vision equipment and both terrestrial and spaceborne antennas for use in the government, defense, emergency service, and commercial sectors. They specialized in surveillance solutions, microwave weaponry, and electronic warfare. In 2019, it merged with L3 Technologies to form L3Harris Technologies.

Headquartered in Melbourne, Florida, the company had approximately $7 billion of annual revenue. It was the largest private-sector employer in Brevard County, Florida (approximately 6,000). From 1988 to 1999, the company was the parent of Intersil, under the name Harris Semiconductor.

In 2016, Harris was named one of the top hundred federal contractors by Defense News. In January 2015, Wired magazine ranked Harris Corporation—tied with U.S. Marshals Service—as the number two threat to privacy and communications on the Internet.

== History ==
Harris Corporation logo used from 1974 to 1998

The "Harris Automatic Press Company" was founded by Alfred S. Harris in Niles, Ohio, in 1895. The company spent the next 60 years developing lithographic processes and printing presses before acquiring typesetting company Intertype Corporation.

Harris-Seybold lithographic press in use

In 1957, Harris acquired Gates Radio, a producer of broadcast transmitters and associated electronics gear, but kept the Gates brand name alive by putting the Gates sticker on the back of numerous transmitters that were labeled Harris on the front panels.

The same year, they acquired Intertype Corporation, a typesetting machine manufacturer based in New York, New York.

In 1959, they acquired microwave technology company PRD Electronics, also headquartered in Brooklyn, New York.

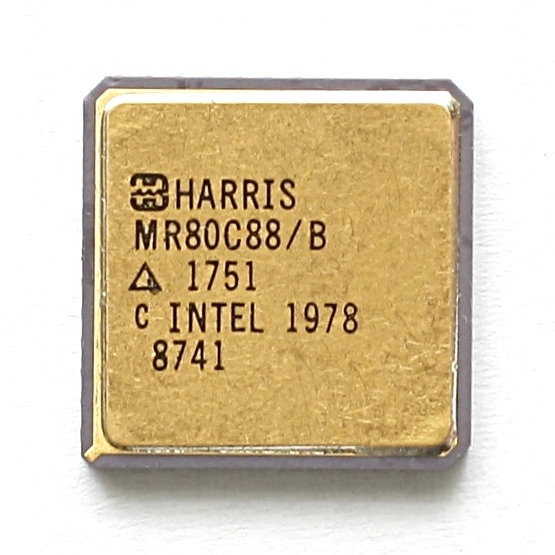
Harris MR80C88 processor

In 1967, they merged with Radiation Incorporated (formed in 1950) of Melbourne, Florida, a developer of antenna, integrated circuit and modem technology used in the space race. The company headquarters was moved from Cleveland to Melbourne in 1978.

In 1969, Harris Corporation acquired RF Communications and Farinon Electric Corporation, furthering its microwave assets. The printing operations were sold off in 1983 and became part of manroland Goss in 2018.

In 1974, Harris acquired Datacraft Corporation, which led to the formation of the Harris Computer Systems Division. The division made a line of minicomputers for the real-time systems market. In 1994, the division was spun out into the independent Harris Computer Systems Corporation.

In 1979, Harris formed a semiconductor joint venture Matra Harris Semiconductors (MHS), from which Harris withdrew in 1989. After further changes MHS was taken over by Atmel.

In 1983, Harris acquired Lanier Business Products, Inc., a dictation, word processing and computer company based in Atlanta, Georgia. By the start of the 1990s, Lanier accounted for about 1/3 of Harris Corporation's revenues. In 1998, Harris spun Lanier back off as a publicly traded company, but also saddled it with over $700 million in debt.

In 1988, Harris acquired GE's semiconductor business, which at this time, also incorporated the Intersil and RCA semiconductor businesses. These were combined with Harris' existing semiconductor businesses.

In 1996, Harris Corporation formed a joint venture with Shenzhen Telecom Company to produce and sell Harris' digital microwave radios and integrate them with other systems.

In November 1998, Harris sold its commercial and standard military logic (semiconductor) product lines to Texas Instruments, which included the HC/HCT, AC/ACT, FCT, and CD4000 product families. Harris retained production of the radiation-hardened versions of these products.

In 1999, Harris spun off their remaining semiconductor business as an independent company, under the Intersil name.

In 2005, the corporation spent $870 million on research and development.

Harris Corporation developed a Hand Held Computer for use during the address canvassing portion of the 2010 United States census. Secured access via a fingerprint swipe guaranteed that only the verified user had access to the unit. A GPS capacity was integral to the daily address management and the transfer of information that was gathered. Of major importance was the security and integrity of the personal and private information of the populace.

In January 2011, Harris re-opened its Calgary, Alberta avionics operation, Harris Canada Inc.. The expanded facility's operations include among others the support of the work to be completed under the company's six-year, $273 million (CAD) services contract with the Government of Canada for the CF-18 Avionics Optimized Weapon System Support (OWSS) program.

In December 2012, Harris Corporation sold its broadcast equipment operations to the Gores Group which operated as Harris Broadcast and is now GatesAir. Harris received $225M for the transaction, exactly half of what it paid seven years earlier for Leitch Technology, its final acquisition for the Broadcast division.

On May 29, 2015, the purchase of competitor Exelis Inc. was finalized, almost doubling the size of the original company.

In July 2015, Harris Corporation sold its healthcare division, Harris Healthcare Solutions, to NantHealth.

In January 2017, Harris sold its government IT services division to Veritas Capital for $690 million. After being acquired by Veritas, this business was renamed Peraton.

In October 2018 Harris announced an all-stock "merger of equals" with New York-based L3 Technologies, to be closed (subject to approvals) in mid-2019. The new company, called L3 Harris Technologies, Inc., is based in Melbourne, Florida.

In 2019, Elbit Systems of America, the American division of the Israeli Elbit Systems, agreed to purchase Harris's night vision product line for $350 million, contingent on the completion of Harris's merger with L3. Federal regulations had required that Harris divest its night vision business as L3 already had its own night vision business and merger between the two companies would effectively eliminate competition in the industry. That purchase closed in September 2019, and Harris Night Vision was subsequently renamed Elbit Systems of America - Night Vision.

== Business segments ==
=== Communication Systems ===
The Harris Communication Systems segment served markets in tactical and airborne radios, night vision technology and defense and public safety networks.

=== Electronic Systems ===
The Harris Electronic Systems segment provided products and services in electronic warfare, air traffic management, avionics, wireless technology, C4I, undersea systems and aerostructures.

Electronic Systems (ES) division provided the "ALQ-214" radio frequency jamming equipment for the U.S. Navy's F/A-18 Hornet aircraft. The ALQ-214 was originally developed by Exelis ES, which Harris acquired in 2015. ES is also a provider of components in the avionics package and targeting systems for the U.S. Navy's F/A-18 and EA-18 Growlers.

=== Space and Intelligence Systems ===
The Harris Space and Intelligence Systems segment, formed when Harris purchased Exelis, provides capabilities in Earth observation, weather, geospatial monitoring, space protection and intelligence, including sensors and payloads, ground processing and information analytics.

==== Cell-site simulators ====
Harris Corporation produced multiple cell-site simulator products, such as the StingRay and Hailstorm phone trackers (see table below); These masquerade as legitimate cellphone towers duping mobile devices to connect to them instead of real cellular networks, so all wireless voice and data traffic originating in a given area are intercepted by the systems, enabling Stingray operators to conduct mass surveillance and triangulate the position of mobile devices.

Originally developed for the U.S. Navy and later used in the global "war on terror" outside the US, they have increasingly been used by US police agencies. More than six U.S. federal agencies use these platforms, including the FBI, Drug Enforcement Administration and Immigration and Customs Enforcement. The American Civil Liberties Union (ACLU) says at least 53 law enforcement agencies in 21 states, use this or similar devices.

These platforms are controversial as they surveil communications of all mobile devices in their vicinity, including those of individuals not suspected of any crimes. Harris have been criticized by civil rights advocates for requiring local municipalities, police and state governments to enter into non-disclosure agreements (NDA) and to conceal usage of these platforms from citizens and the courts. Such NDA may violate public record and open access laws. The ACLU, Electronic Privacy Information Center (EPIC), Electronic Frontier Foundation (EFF) filed two successful civil lawsuits over denied Freedom of Information Act (FOIA) requests and violations of the public records laws of Florida.

In September 2014, as a result of successful litigation, ACLU received documents and emails between Harris Corporation and the Federal Communications Commission relating to FCC approval of Harris' surveillance systems. ACLU then sent a letter to FCC stating, in their view, Harris misled FCC Office of Engineering and Technology staff during the regulatory review process by falsely claiming the systems were only used in emergency situations and not criminal investigations.

In 2006, Harris employees directly conducted wireless surveillance using StingRay units on behalf of the Palm Bay Police Department—where Harris has a campus—in response to a bomb threat against a middle school. The search was conducted without a warrant or judicial oversight.

In 2015, Santa Clara County withdrew from contract negotiations with Harris for StingRay units, noting the reason was the onerous restrictions imposed by Harris on what could be released under public records requests.

Mobile Phone Monitoring Products from Harris Corp.
Product	Introduced	Cost	Features
StingRay	2001	$68,479	IMSI-catcher. Gathers information from mobile phones including location and metadata
StingRay II	2007	$134,952	IMSI-catcher. Gathers information from mobile phones including location and metadata
Kingfish	2003	$25,349	Surveillance transceiver for tracking mobile phones
Amberjack	2002	$35,015	Directional antenna used to help track mobile phones; used in conjunction with StingRay, Gossamer and Kingfish
Harpoon	2008	$16,000–19,000	Linear amplifier to boost the signal of a StingRay or Kingfish
Hailstorm	?	$169,602	IMSI catcher. Gathers information from mobile phones including location and metadata. Also can intercept content.
Gossamer	2001	$19,696	IMSI catcher, smaller than StingRay, can be used for denial-of-service attacks on phones.
Triggerfish	1997	$90,000–102,000	Intercepts mobile conversations in real time. May be obsolete

== List of Harris acquisitions ==
- Farinon (1980)
- Datacraft Corporation (1974)
- T.W. & C.B. Sheridan Company (1964)
- PRD Electronics (1959)
- Gates Radio (1957)
- Intertype Corporation (1957) which led to the change of name from Harris-Seybold to Harris-Intertype Corporation.
- Lanier Business Products, Inc. (1983)
- Exelis Inc. (2015)
- Carefx (2011)
- Schlumberger Global Communications Services (GCS) Division (2011)
- CapRock Communications (2010)
- SignaCert (2010)*
- SolaCom ATC Solutions (2009)
- Tyco Electronics (MA-COM) Wireless Systems (2009)
- Crucial Security, Inc. (2009)
- Zandar Technologies Ltd. (2007)
- Multimax (2007)
- Aastra Digital Video (2006)
- Optimal Solutions, Inc. (2006)
- Leitch Technology (2005)
- Orkand Corporation (2004 – Now Harris IT Services)
- Encoda Systems (2004)
- ImageLinks, Inc. (2004)
- Hirschmann Multimedia Communications Network (2001)
- Exigent International, Inc. (2001)
- Wavtrace, Inc. (2000)
- Lucent Technologies' Point-to-Point Microwave Business (2000)
- Louth Automation (2000)
- Audio Broadcast Group, Inc. (1999)
- Pacific Research & Engineering Corporation (1999)
- CHOICE Microsystems (1999)
- Intraplex, Inc. (1999)
- Agfa Copying Systems, Inc. (1998)
- Trans-Comp, Inc. (1998 – Spun off with Lanier Worldwide)
- Northeast Broadcast Lab (1997)
- NovAtel Communications (1995)
- Triplett Corporation's Cellular and Telecommunications Business (1995)

== People ==
- Asher A. Friesem, former engineer
- Howard Lance, former CEO
- Edythe Perlick, former player in All-American Girls Professional Baseball League
- Frank Pritt, former salesperson
- Joan C. Sherman, first woman technical director
- Robert G. Moses, 33 year employee

== See also ==
- PositiveID, a US government contracted Florida-based biotech company that specializes in tracking tech for the U.S. military
