= Ravenscar profile =

Feature of the Ada programming language

The Ravenscar profile is a subset of the Ada tasking features designed for safety-critical hard real-time computing. It was defined by a separate technical report in Ada 95; it is now part of the Ada 2012 Standard. It has been named after the English village of Ravenscar, the location of the 8th International Real-Time Ada Workshop (IRTAW 8).

== Restrictions of the profile ==
A Ravenscar Ada application uses the following compiler directive:

pragma Profile (Ravenscar);

This is the same as writing the following set of configuration pragmas:

pragma Task_Dispatching_Policy (FIFO_Within_Priorities);
pragma Locking_Policy (Ceiling_Locking);
pragma Detect_Blocking;
pragma Restrictions (
                 No_Abort_Statements,
                 No_Calendar,
                 No_Dynamic_Attachment,
                 No_Dynamic_Priorities,
                 No_Implicit_Heap_Allocations,
                 No_Local_Protected_Objects,
                 No_Local_Timing_Events,
                 No_Protected_Type_Allocators,
                 No_Relative_Delay,
                 No_Requeue_Statements,
                 No_Select_Statements,
                 No_Specific_Termination_Handlers,
                 No_Task_Allocators,
                 No_Task_Hierarchy,
                 No_Task_Termination,
                 Simple_Barriers,
                 Max_Entry_Queue_Length => 1,
                 Max_Protected_Entries  => 1,
                 Max_Task_Entries       => 0,
                 No_Dependence => Ada.Asynchronous_Task_Control,
                 No_Dependence => Ada.Calendar,
                 No_Dependence => Ada.Execution_Time.Group_Budget,
                 No_Dependence => Ada.Execution_Time.Timers,
                 No_Dependence => Ada.Task_Attributes);

== See also ==
- Ada (programming language)
- High-integrity software
- SPARK (programming language)
- From "Ada Reference Manual (Ada 2022"): (D.13 The Ravenscar and Jorvik Profiles)
