= Ada Programming Support Environment =

Programming environment specification

Ada Programming Support Environment (APSE) was a specification for a programming environment to support software development in the Ada programming language. This represented the second stage of the U.S. military Ada project; once the language was implemented, it was felt necessary to specify and implement a standard set of tools, hence the APSE. CAIS-A, Common APSE Interface Set A, was defined in MIL STD-1838A.

CAIS defines a set of Ada APIs to enable portability of development tools across operating systems. As of 1988, CAIS implementations were developed for Unix, VMS and IBM MVS.
