= Netco Government Services =

American network infrastructure company

Previously known as Netco Government Services, Harris ITS is a privately held business headquartered in Herndon, Virginia, U.S. that provides network services to various branches of the US Government.

== History ==
In 2006 the company was purchased by Harris Corporation and made into a new sect known as Harris ITS (Information Technology services). Harris Corp is located in Melbourne, Florida.

Netco's predecessor company, WAM!NET, was founded in 2000 in Minnesota and was substantially taken over by a $100 million investment in 2001 by Cerberus Capital Management. WAM!NET's commercial business and the rights to the name WAM!NET were sold in July 2003 to SAVVIS, and the part that handled government contracts, specifically the Navy-Marine Corps Intranet contract (NMCI), was renamed as Netco. NMCI continues to be its main source of revenue. The company claims more than 600 employees nationwide, the majority holding security clearances.

Netco provides network infrastructure and IT support services for government agencies including the Bureau of Alcohol, Tobacco, Firearms, and Explosives (ATF), Department of Defense (DOD), Department of Energy (DOE), Federal Aviation Administration (FAA), National Reconnaissance Office (NRO), National Security Agency (NSA), Office of Naval Research (ONR), U.S. Marine Corps, and the U.S. Navy.

Netco purchased Multimax for its Air Force contracts and assumed its name in 2006. Netco, technically, no longer exists.
