= Nads =

Nads may refer to:

- Nads, slang for gonads
- Rafael Nadal, Spanish tennis player nicknamed Nads
- National Advanced Driving Simulator, or NADS
- Neutron Acceptance Diagram Shading, or NADS
- Sodium lauryl sulfate, or NaDS
