= Journal of Neutron Research =

- Discipline: Neutron scattering, Instrumentation
- Language: English
- Edited by: E. Lelièvre-Berna

Publication details
- History: 1993-present
- Publisher: IOS Press
- Frequency: Quarterly

Standard abbreviations
- ISO 4: J. Neutron Res.

Indexing
- CODEN: JNREFM
- ISSN: 1023-8166 (print); 1477-2655 (web)
- OCLC no.: 874511321

Links
- Journal homepage; Online access; Online archive

The Journal of Neutron Research is a peer-reviewed scientific journal published by IOS Press. It was established in 1993 and covers research on Neutron scattering and its applications. It publishes original research papers of an experimental and theoretical nature in three areas of specialisation:

- Research Science with Neutrons
- Neutron Instrumentation and Techniques
- Reactor/Spallation Neutron Source Technology
- Neutron Simulation Tools e.g. McStas and VITESS, Data Reduction and Data Analysis

Authors are invited to use LaTeX or Microsoft Word templates and the IOS Press Open Library offers authors an Open Access option.

== Abstracting and indexing ==
The journal is abstracted and indexed in:

- Academic Search Complete
- Chemical Abstracts Service
- Dimensions
- Google Scholar
- Inspec Physics Abstracts
- Microsoft Academic Search
- Scopus
- Web of Science: Emerging Sources Citation Index

== See also ==
- Scattering theory
- Nuclear physics
