= Cognitive Research Corporation Driving Simulator =

The Cognitive Research Corporation Driving Simulator (CRCDS) is a PC-based driving simulator used to test the effects of various factors (such as age, trauma, neurologic disease, alcohol and fatigue) on driving performance. The CRCDS software is ported from the National Advanced Driving Simulator (NADS).

== Specifications ==
Cognitive Research Corporation (CRC) designed the CRCDS for pharmaceutical research use. The system consists of a single PC, three 21-inch LCD monitors (105-degree field of view), a full-size steering wheel and pedals, an instrument panel display, a 2.1 audio system, a tactile transducer, and a separate display for the Coach/Instructor.

== Simulator scenarios ==
=== Country Vigilance scenario ===
The monotonous Country Vigilance scenario has been demonstrated to be sensitive to detecting the effects of fatigue or sleepiness on driving performance. This scenario has been used for evaluating patients with a variety of conditions including Obstructive Sleep Apnea (OSA), measuring the effects of sleep deprivation, chronic primary insomnia, and is sensitive to CNS depressants (e.g., alcohol and sedating antihistamines).

=== Screening scenario ===
This is a brief drive that comprises several minutes of the Country Vigilance Scenario. The purpose of this drive is to provide an introductory experience for the participant and to determine if they are likely to experience simulator sickness when using the driving simulator.

=== Familiarization scenario ===
The purpose of this drive is to provide standardized instructions on the operation of the driving simulator. It comprises several minutes of the Country Vigilance Scenario, followed by several minutes of the Country Vigilance Scenario with a divided attention task.

=== Practice scenario ===
This scenario was designed to provide the participant with the standardized practice of the driving tasks being completed during testing. The Practice Scenario consists of several minutes of the Country Vigilance Scenario Driving.
