= Conversion tracking =

With reference to display media and search media, conversion tracking is the measurement of media performance with reference to campaign key performance indicators (KPIs).

This process functions thanks to a JavaScript tracker or a pixel tracker (when JavaScript is disabled, for instance in emails), which instantaneously records quantitative actions. Results are cross-referenced with the KPIs, or measures of success, to gauge if the media inventory has achieved its targeting parameters.

Common measures of success include:

- Conversion rate: the ratio of orders to visitors
- Drop-off rate: the ratio of users that started processes but did not finish
- Clickthrough rate: the ratio of total visitors with exposure to an advertisement, over those visitors who clicked through to the website
- Registration rate: the ratio of website visitors who register to visitors leaving the site without registering again
- Interaction rate: the ratio of users,, who have been exposed to the ad to those who have interacted

The rise of programmatic buying has allowed faster and more efficient campaign optimization, therefore the examples above are a snapshot of the multitude of conversion metrics that a campaign can achieve.

Measures of success (KPIs) usually differ by the campaign and creative concept.
