= JHD =

JHD may refer to:

- Jon-Henri Damski
- Journal of Huntington's Disease
- John Herbert Dillinger
