= Restorative Neurology and Neuroscience =

Academic journal in neurology

- Discipline: Neurology, neuroscience
- Language: English
- Edited by: Bernhard A. Sabel

Publication details
- History: 1989–present
- Publisher: IOS Press
- Frequency: Bimonthly
- Open access: Hybrid
- Impact factor: 2.8 (2022)

Standard abbreviations
- ISO 4: Restor. Neurol. Neurosci.

Indexing
- CODEN: RNNEEL
- ISSN: 0922-6028 (print); 1878-3627 (web)
- OCLC no.: 21370874

Links
- Journal homepage; Online archive

Restorative Neurology and Neuroscience is a bimonthly peer-reviewed medical journal published by IOS Press that was established in 1989. The editor-in-chief is Bernhard A. Sabel (Otto von Guericke University Magdeburg), covering pre-clinical or clinical research in the fields of neurology, neuroscience, and neuroregeneration. Formats of publication include original research reports, review papers, and rapid communications ("letters").

== Abstracting and indexing ==
The journal is abstracted and indexed in:

- Chemical Abstracts Service
- EBSCO databases
- Embase
- Index Medicus/MEDLINE/PubMed
- Science Citation Index Expanded
- Scopus

According to the Journal Citation Reports, the journal has a 2022 impact factor of 2.8.
