= Center for Computer-Aided Design =

The Center for Computer-Aided Design (CCAD) is a research center in the College of Engineering at the University of Iowa in Iowa City, Iowa. Faculty, staff, and students conduct basic and applied research in modeling and simulation in CCAD's six research units: the National Advanced Driving Simulator (NADS); the Operator Performance Laboratory (OPL); the Virtual Soldier Research Program (VSR); the Musculoskeletal Imaging, Modeling, and Experimentation group (MIMX); the Reliability and Sensory Prognostic Systems group (RSPS); and the BioMechanics of Soft Tissues group (BioMOST).

CCAD was founded in 1981 by Professor Edward J. Haug and is currently under the direction of Professor Karim Abdel-Malek. Notable developments at CCAD have included the Iowa Driving Simulator, the National Advanced Driving Simulator, and the virtual human Santos™.
