= Imagix 4D =

Imagix 4D is a source code analysis tool from Imagix Corporation, used primarily for understanding, documenting, and evolving existing C, C++ and Java software.

Applied technologies include full semantic source analysis. Software visualization supports program comprehension. Static data flow analysis-based verifications detect problems in variable usage, task interactions and concurrency. Software metrics measure design quality and identify potential testing and maintenance issues.

== See also ==
- Rational Rose
- Rigi
- Software visualization
- List of tools for static code analysis
- Sourcetrail
