= Semantic Web (journal) =

- Discipline: Semantic web, linked data, ontology engineering
- Language: English
- Edited by: Krzysztof Janowicz

Publication details
- History: 2010–present
- Publisher: IOS Press
- Frequency: Bimonthly
- Open access: Yes
- Impact factor: 3.524 (2019)

Standard abbreviations
- ISO 4: Semant. Web

Indexing
- ISSN: 1570-0844 (print); 2210-4968 (web)

Links
- Journal homepage; Online archive

Semantic Web - Interoperability, Usability, Applicability is a bimonthly peer-reviewed scientific journal published by IOS Press. It was established in 2010 and covers the foundations and applications of semantic web technologies, knowledge graph, and linked data. The journal uses an open peer-review process. The journal publishes its metadata online in the form of linked data and provides scientometrics such as the geographic distribution of authors, citation networks, trends in research topics over time, and so forth. The founding editors-in-chief are Pascal Hitzler (Kansas State University) (from 2010-2023) and Krzysztof Janowicz (University of California, Santa Barbara and University of Vienna) (2010-).

The journal follows an open and transparent review process, sharing all paper-related metadata, such as reviews and decisions online. It originally combined freely available author-versions of accepted papers with a subscription model and optional open access to published versions (green open access together with hybrid open access). In October 2019 the journal announced that it will go full (gold) open access and full open access was implemented 1 January 2020. Starting 29 April 2021, the journal implemented an Open Science Data policy that requires authors to publicly provide data and software relevant to their manuscript.

The journal is abstracted and indexed by Science Citation Index Expanded and Scopus. According to the Journal Citation Reports, the journal has a 2019 impact factor of 3.524.
