= International Semantic Web Conference =

- Abbreviation: ISWC
- Discipline: Semantic Web

Publication details
- Publisher: Springer-Verlag
- History: 2002-
- Frequency: annual
- Open access: no

The International Semantic Web Conference (ISWC) is a series of academic conferences and the premier international forum for the Semantic Web, Linked Data and Knowledge Graph Community. Here, scientists, industry specialists, and practitioners meet to discuss the future of practical, scalable, user-friendly, and game changing solutions. Its proceedings are published in the Lecture Notes in Computer Science by Springer-Verlag.

The annual ISWC conference series was established in 2002 by the Semantic Web Science Association (SWSA) after the success of the Semantic Web Working Symposium, a three-day conference held at Stanford University in the summer of 2001. SWSA continues to oversee the ISWC conference and choose organizers for future ISWC instances based on bids.

== Overview ==
ISWC conferences
Conference	Date	Place	Proceedings	Awards	Notes
ISWC 2026	25–29 October	Bari, Italy	LNCS vol. tbd		
ISWC 2025	2–6 November	Nara, Japan	LNCS vol. 16140, LNCS vol. 16141	Best Research Track Paper Award: Yiwen Peng, Thomas Bonald and Fabian Suchanek: FLORA: Unsupervised Knowledge Graph Alignment by Fuzzy Logic	
ISWC 2024	11–15 November	(United States) Baltimore, USA	LNCS vol. 15231, LNCS vol. 15232, LNCS vol. 15233	Best Research Track Paper Award: Kate Lin, Tarfah Alrashed and Natasha Noy: Relationships are Complicated! An Analysis of Relationships Between Datasets on the Web Best Research Track Student Paper Award: Benjamín Farías, Wim Martens, Carlos Rojas and Domagoj Vrgoč: PathFinder: Returning Paths in Graph Queries	
ISWC 2023	6–10 November	Athens, Greece	LNCS vol. 14265, LNCS vol. 14266	Best Research Track Paper Award: Genivika Mann, Alishiba Dsouza, Ran Yu and Elena Demidova: Spatial Link Prediction with Spatial and Semantic Embeddings Best Research Track Student Paper Award: Alishiba Dsouza, Ran Yu, Moritz Windoffer and Elena Demidova: Iterative Geographic Entity Alignment with Cross-Attention	
ISWC 2022	23-27 October	Hangzhou, China	LNCS vol. 13489	Best Paper: Larry González, Alex Ivliev, Markus Krötzsch, Stephan Mennicke: Efficient Dependency Analysis for Rule-Based Ontologies	
ISWC 2021	24–28 October	(United States) Albany, New York, USA	LNCS vol. 12922	Best Paper: Mehdi Ali, Max Berrendorf, Mikhail Galkin, Veronika Thost, Tengfei Ma, Volker Tresp, Jens Lehmann: Improving Inductive Link Prediction Using Hyper-Relational Facts	
ISWC 2020	2–6 November	Athens, Greece	LNCS vol. 12506, LNCS vol. 12507	Best Paper: Ronald Denaux, Jose Manuel Gomez-Perez: Linked Credibility Reviews for Explainable Misinformation Detection Best Student Paper: Timo Homburg, Steffen Staab, Daniel Janke: GeoSPARQL+: Syntax, Semantics and System for Integrated Querying of Graph, Raster and Vector Data	
ISWC 2019	26–30 October	Auckland, New Zealand	LNCS vol. 11778, LNCS vol. 11779	Best Paper: Julien Corman, Fernando Florenzano, Juan L. Reutter and Ognjen Savkovic: Validating SHACL constraints over a SPARQL endpoint Best Student Paper: Hernan Vargas, Carlos Buil Aranda, Aidan Hogan and Claudia López: RDF Explorer: A Visual Query Builder for Semantic Web Knowledge Graphs Vito Walter Anelli, Tommaso Di Noia, Eugenio Di Sciascio, Azzurra Ragone and Joseph Trotta: How to make latent factors interpretable by feeding Factorization machines with knowledge graphs	
ISWC 2018	8–12 October	(United States) Monterey, California, USA	LNCS vol. 11136, LNCS vol. 11137	Best Paper: Sumit Bhatia, Purusharth Dwivedi and Avneet Kaur: That’s interesting, tell me more! Finding descriptive support passages for explaining knowledge graph relationships Best Student Paper: Jaime Salas and Aidan Hogan: Canonicalisation of monotone SPARQL queries	
ISWC 2017	21–25 October	Vienna, Austria	LNCS vol. 10587, LNCS vol. 10588	Best Paper: Olaf Hartig, Ian Letter and Jorge Pérez: A Formal Framework for Comparing Linked Data Fragments Best Student Paper: Stephan Baier, Volker Tresp and Yunpu Ma: Improving Visual Relationship Detection using Semantic Modeling of Scene Descriptions	
ISWC 2016	17–21 October	Kobe, Japan	LNCS vol. 9981, LNCS vol. 9982	Best Paper: Renzo Angles and Claudio Gutierrez: The multiset semantics of SPARQL patterns Linhong Zhu, Majid Ghasemi-Gol, Pedro Szekely, Aram Galstyan and Craig A. Knoblock: Unsupervised Entity Resolution on Multi-type Graphs Best Student Paper: Lei Zhang, Achim Rettinger, and Ji Zhang: A Probabilistic Model for Time-Aware Entity Recommendation	
ISWC 2015	11–15 October	(United States) Bethlehem, Pennsylvania, USA	LNCS vol. 9366, LNCS vol. 9367	Best Paper: L. Rietveld, W. Beek, and S. Schlobach: LOD Lab: Experiments at LOD Scale Best Student Paper: Y. Roussakis, I. Chrysakis, K. Stefanidis, G. Flouris, and Y. Starakas: A Flexible Framework for Understanding the Dynamics of Evolving RDF Datasets	
ISWC 2014	19–23 October	Riva del Garda, Italy	LNCS vol. 8796, LNCS vol. 8797	Best Paper: Ricardo Usbeck, Axel-Cyrille Ngonga Ngomo, Michael Röder, Daniel Gerber, Sandro Athaide Coelho, Sören Auer and Andreas Both: AGDISTIS - Graph-Based Disambiguation of Named Entities using Linked Data Best Student Paper: Juan F. Sequeda, Marcelo Arenas and Daniel P. Miranker: OBDA: Query Rewriting or Materialization? In Practice, Both!	
ISWC 2013	21–25 October	Sydney, Australia	LNCS vol. 8218, LNCS vol. 8219	Best Paper: Carsten Lutz, Inanc Seylan, David Toman and Frank Wolter: The Combined Approach to OBDA: Taming Role Hierarchies using Filters Best Student Paper: Jay Pujara, Hui Miao, Lise Getoor, William Cohen: Knowledge Graph Identification	
ISWC 2012	11–15 November	(United States) Boston, USA	LNCS vol. 7649, LNCS vol. 7650	Best Paper: Rahul Parundekar, Craig Knoblock and José Luis Ambite: Discovering Concept Coverings in Ontologies of Linked Data Sources Best Student Paper: Jean Christoph Jung and Carsten Lutz: Ontology-Based Access to Probabilistic Data with OWL QL	
ISWC 2011	23–27 October	Bonn, Germany	LNCS vol. 7031, LNCS vol. 7032	Best Paper: Mohamed Morsey, Jens Lehmann, Sören Auer and Axel-Cyrille Ngonga Ngomo: DBpedia SPARQL Benchmark Performance Assessment with Real Queries on Real Data Best Student Paper: Chiara Del Vescovo, Damian Gessler, Pavel Klinov, Bijan Parsia, Ulrike Sattler, Thomas Schneider and Andrew Winget: Decomposition and Modular Structure of BioPortal Ontologies	
ISWC 2010	7–11 November	Shanghai, China	LNCS vol. 6496, LNCS vol. 6497	Best Paper: Shenghui Wang and Paul Groth: Measuring the dynamic bi-directional influence between content and social networks Best Student Paper: Heather S. Packer, Nicholas Gibbins and Nicholas R. Jennings: Forgetting Fragments from Evolving OWL Ontologies	
ISWC 2009	25–29 October	(United States) Washington, DC, USA	LNCS vol. 5823	Best Paper: Ugur Kuter and Jennifer Golbeck: Semantic Web Service Composition in Social Environments Best Student Paper: Vicky Papavassiliou, Giorgos Flouris, Irini Fundulaki, Dimitris Kotzinos, and Vassilis Christophides: On Detecting High-Level Changes in RDF/S KBs	
ISWC 2008	26–30 October	Karlsruhe, Germany	LNCS vol. 5318	Best Paper: Matthew Horridge, Bijan Parsia and Ulrike Sattler: Laconic and Precise Justifications in OWL	
ISWC 2007	11–15 November	Busan, South Korea	LNCS vol. 4825	Best Paper: Dimitris Zeginis, Yannis Tzitzikas, and Vassilis Christophides: On the Foundations of Computing Deltas between RDF models Best Student Paper: Sean Falconer and Margaret-Anne Storey: A cognitive support framework for ontology mapping	Held together with ASWC 2007.
ISWC 2006	5–9 November	(United States) Athens, Georgia, USA	LNCS vol. 4273	Best Paper: Marcelo Arenas, Jorge Perez and Claudio Gutierrez: Semantics and Complexity of SPARQL	
ISWC 2005	6–10 November	(Republic of Ireland) Galway, Ireland	LNCS vol. 3729	Best Paper: Peter Mika: Ontologies are us: A unified model of social networks and semantics	
ISWC 2004	7–11 November	Hiroshima, Japan	LNCS vol. 3298	Best Paper: Y. Guo, Z. Pan, and J. Heflin: An Evaluation of Knowledge Base Systems for Large OWL Datasets	
ISWC 2003	20–23 October	(United States) Sanibel Island, USA	LNCS vol. 2870	Best Paper: Aimilia Magkanaraki, Val Tannen, Vassilis Christophides, Dimitris Plexousakis: Viewing the Semantic Web through RVL Lenses	
ISWC 2002	9–12 June	Sardinia, Italy	LNCS vol. 2342	Best Paper: Peter F. Patel-Schneider, Jérôme Siméon: Building the Semantic Web on XML	
