= UXF =

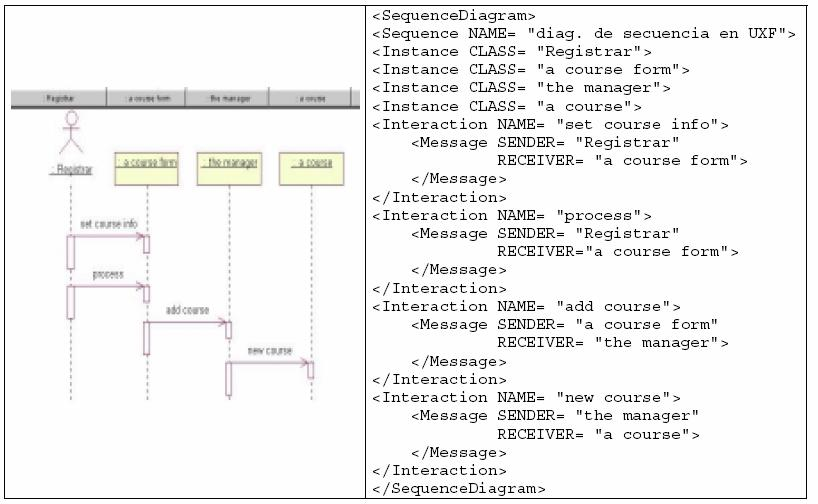
Example of UXF

In computing, UML eXchange Format (UXF) is a XML-based model interchange format for Unified Modeling Language (UML), which is a standard software modeling language. UXF is a structured format described in 1998 and intended to encode, publish, access and exchange UML models.

More recent alternatives include XML Metadata Interchange and OMG's Diagram Definition standard.

== Known uses ==
- UMLet is an application that uses UXF as its native file format.
