= Dongmei Zhang =

Computer scientist

Dongmei Zhang is a scientist known for her contributions to data intelligence, knowledge computing, information visualization, and software engineering. She currently serves as a distinguished scientist and deputy managing director at Microsoft Research Asia (MSRA), where she leads research in data, knowledge, and intelligence.

== Education ==
Zhang earned her Ph.D. in robotics from the School of Computer Science at Carnegie Mellon University, following her B.E. and M.E. degrees from Tsinghua University.

== Professional contributions ==
Joining Microsoft in 2001, Zhang played a pivotal role in developing the Microsoft PhotoStory product. In 2004, she transitioned to MSRA, leading Digital Ink research and making significant advancements in handwriting recognition technologies, including math equation recognition, chemical formula recognition, and East Asian language recognition. Her team's innovations have been integrated into various Microsoft products, such as Windows 7 and Microsoft Math 3.0.

In 2009, Zhang founded the Software Analytics group at MSRA, focusing on interdisciplinary research that spans big data, machine learning, systems, and software engineering. Her team's work has notably contributed to Microsoft Power BI, enhancing its capabilities in Smart Data Discovery within the business intelligence and data analytics market.

Beyond her research endeavors, Zhang is a strong advocate for diversity and inclusion in the tech industry. She has been actively involved in initiatives aimed at supporting young females pursuing careers in high-tech fields. As Chair of the Microsoft GCR Diversity & Inclusion Council/Women Committee, she collaborates with internal and external partners to foster an inclusive workplace and promote a culture of diversity.

Zhang's scholarly impact is reflected in her extensive list of publications and citations, with a Google Scholar h-index of 63 and over 15,900 citations.

== International conferences ==
Zhang has held several prominent chair positions in international conferences, reflecting her leadership in the software engineering community.

- General chair for ISSTA 2019: Zhang served as the general chair for the International Symposium on Software Testing and Analysis (ISSTA) in 2019.
- Area Co-Chair for Analytics in Research Track at ICSE 2024: She is contributing as an area co-chair for the Analytics in Research Track at the 2024 International Conference on Software Engineering (ICSE).
- 6th International Workshop on Cloud Intelligence / AIOps (AIOps '25): Zhang is serving on the Steering Committee for the 6th International Workshop on Cloud Intelligence / AIOps (AIOps '25) co-located with ICSE 2025 in Ottawa, Canada.
- Program co-chair for ESEC/FSE 2025: Zhang is serving as program co-chair for the 2025 ACM Joint European Software Engineering Conference and Symposium on the Foundations of Software Engineering (ESEC/FSE), scheduled for June 23-27, 2025, in Trondheim, Norway.

== Selected publications ==
- Dongmei Zhang, Shi Han, Yingnong Dang, Jian-Guang Lou, Haidong Zhang "Software Analytics in Practice" (2013)
- Xiaodong Gu, Hongyu Zhang, Dongmei Zhang, Sunghun Kim "Deep API learning" (2016)
- Xu Zhang, Yong Xu, Qingwei Lin, Bo Qiao, Hongyu Zhang, Yingnong Dang, Chunyu Xie, Xinsheng Yang, Qian Cheng, Ze Li, Junjie Chen, Xiaoting He, Randolph Yao, Jian-Guang Lou, Murali Chintalapati, Furao Shen, Dongmei Zhang "Robust log-based anomaly detection on unstable log data" (2019)
- Jiaqi Guo, Zecheng Zhan, Yan Gao, Yan Xiao, Jian-Guang Lou, Ting Liu, Dongmei Zhang "Towards complex text-to-sql in cross-domain database with intermediate representation" (2019)
