= Squale =

Squale - Software QUALity Enhancement
- Stable release: 7.1 / 26 May 2011; 13 years ago
- Written in: Java
- Operating system: Cross-platform
- Type: software quality
- License: GNU Lesser General Public License
- Website: www.squale.org

Squale (Software Quality Enhancement) is an open-source platform that helps monitoring software quality for multi-language applications. It currently supports Java out-of-the-box, and can also analyse C/C++ and Cobol code with an adapter to McCabe tool. Squale is distributed under the terms of the LGPL v3 licence.

Squale is partially funded by the French FUI (Fonds unique interministériel),), labeled by the Systematic Paris-Region competitive cluster and is supported by its FLOSS group.

== See also ==
- Software quality
- ISO/IEC 9126
- Software quality model
