= Hausi A. Muller =

Canadian computer scientist and software engineer

Hausi A. Müller
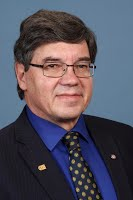
- Born: August 11, 1955 (age 71); Egg, Switzerland
- Spouse: Ulrike Stege
- Scientific career
- Fields: Software Evolution; Self-adaptive System
- Doctoral advisor: Ken Kennedy
- Doctoral students: Margaret-Anne Storey
- Website: http://webhome.cs.uvic.ca/~hausi

Hausi A. Müller (born August 11, 1955 in Egg, Switzerland) is a Canadian computer scientist and software engineer. He is a professor of computer science at the University of Victoria, British Columbia, Canada and a Fellow of the Canadian Academy of Engineering. He earned his B.S. at ETH Zurich and his Ph.D. in 1984 working with Ken Kennedy at Rice University.

He is known for his work in the fields of software evolution and adaptive systems. He was the lead architect of Rigi, an end-user programmable environment for software analysis, exploration, and visualization.

He was General Chair of the ACM/IEEE International Conference on Software Engineering (ICSE 2001) in Toronto. He serves on the IEEE Computer Society Board of Governors (2015–17) and is Vice President of IEEE Computer Society Technical and Conferences Activities Board. He was Chair of the IEEE Computer Society Technical Council on Software Engineering (TCSE) 2010-15. Together with Kenny Wong he has provided an efficient implementation of Fortune's algorithm.

He was co-founder of the first IEEE International Conference on Quantum Computing and Engineering in 2020.

== Awards and honors ==
- IEEE Computer Society Golden Core Member, 2016
- Distinguished Service Award, IEEE Computer Society Technical Council on Software Engineering (TCSE), 2016
- Fellow Canadian Academy of Engineering (FCAE), 2012
- Team Award: IBM Canada Project of the Year Award, IBM Center for Advanced Studies (CAS) Markham, Ontario, Canada, 2011
- IBM CAS Research Special Contributions Award, 2010
