= Rational Software Modeler =

Unified Modeling Language design tool

- Rational Software Modeler with Design Model Diagram
- Developer: Rational Software
- Release: October 13, 2004; 21 years ago
- Stable release: v7.5.5.5
- Written in: ?
- Operating system: Microsoft Windows, Linux
- Available in: ?
- Type: Integrated development environment
- License: IBM EULA
- Website: www.ibm.com/software/awdtools/modeler/swmodeler/

Rational Software Modeler (RSM), made by IBM's Rational Software division, is a Unified Modeling Language (UML) 2.0-based visual modeling and design tool. Rational Software Modeler is based on the Eclipse open-source software framework and is used for visual modeling and model-driven development (MDD) with UML for creating applications and web services. IBM ceased marketing Rational Software Modeler in 2010 and ended support for it in 2015. Much of the same functionality is now available through Rational Software Architect.

== Overview ==
The capabilities of the last major release (Version 7) of Rational Software Modeler include:

1. Support for UML version 2.1
2. Support for model-to-model transformations
3. Model management for parallel development and architectural re-factoring, e.g., split, combine, compare and merge models and model fragments
4. Support for application of design patterns

It is integrated with other IBM Rational Software tools, such as ClearCase configuration management and ClearQuest exception handling (defect reports and change requests).

RSM is engineered as a plugin that sits on top of the open-source Eclipse development platform. RSM can be installed either on top of an existing Eclipse v3.2 installation, or as a new Eclipse v3.2 instance.

As RSM is Eclipse-based, it can use third-party Eclipse plugins, as well as plugins specifically for Rational tools.

== History ==
Rational Software has a long history in application modeling, beginning in the early 1990s with the work of Grady Booch, James Rumbaugh and Ivar Jacobson. They combined competing modeling approaches to form what eventually became the Unified Modeling Language.

Rational Software's first visual modeling and development tool was Rational Rose, a stand-alone modeling tool that integrated the application programming interface (API) level with third-party Integrated Development Environments (IDEs) in order to support a variety of programming languages and other implementation technologies.

While Rational Rose was an important step towards bringing Model-driven development (MDD) closer to practicing software developers, it was found that only a small fraction of developers used modeling on a routine basis. A key problem was identified – developers didn't like to leave their IDE. They wanted visual modeling to be integrated — not with their IDE, but rather inside their IDE.

Rational responded to this need in 2002 with IBM Rational XDE software, providing a development environment for the programming technologies emerging at the time: Java and Microsoft .NET. IBM Rational XDE was characterized as the next generation of IBM Rational Rose — not a new version of it (hence the name change), and not necessarily a replacement for Rose (since IBM Rational XDE was purposefully restricted to support only a select number of IDEs and implementation technologies). However, with each addition of a tool or capability came another point-to-point integration requirement. As more and more capabilities were added, Rational began to reach the practical limits of this style of tool integration.

For the next-generation MDD products, model-driven development functions were built on top of Eclipse to form a more complete MDD tool. IBM Rational Software Architect, IBM Rational Software Modeler and IBM Rational Systems Developer were the result of these changes; merging the silos that previously defined modeling, development and code analysis into a more integrated design.

== IBM Rational Software Modeler versions ==
- v6.0: Released December 2004. Based on Eclipse v3.0, UML v2.0.
- v7.0: Released December 2006. Based on Eclipse v3.2, UML v2.1.
- v7.5: Released September 2008.
- v7.5.5.5: Last version released.

== List of Eclipse-based IBM analysis, design and construction products ==
- Rational Application Developer
- Rational Software Architect
- Rational Systems Developer
- Rational Business Developer Extension
- WebSphere Integration Developer

== See also ==
- List of integrated development environments
- Rational Software
