= NeuroRehabilitation =

- Discipline: Neurological rehabilitation
- Language: English
- Edited by: Nathan D. Zasler

Publication details
- History: 1991–present
- Publisher: IOS Press
- Frequency: 8/year
- Open access: Hybrid
- Impact factor: 1.7 (2023)

Standard abbreviations
- ISO 4: NeuroRehabilitation

Indexing
- CODEN: NRORFG
- ISSN: 1053-8135 (print); 1878-6448 (web)
- LCCN: sn90005461
- OCLC no.: 803541857

Links
- Journal homepage; Online access; Online archive

NeuroRehabilitation is a peer-reviewed medical journal covering all aspects of neurological rehabilitation. It was established in 1991 and is published by IOS Press. The editor-in-chief is Nathan D. Zasler (University of Virginia). The journal also publishes thematically organized issues that focus on specific clinical disorders, types of therapy, and age groups.

== Abstracting and indexing ==
The journal is abstracted and indexed by MEDLINE/PubMed, EBSCO databases, Scopus, and the Science Citation Index Expanded. According to the Journal Citation Reports, the journal has a 2023 impact factor of 1.7.
