= Driving simulator =

Professional simulator designed for beginner drivers

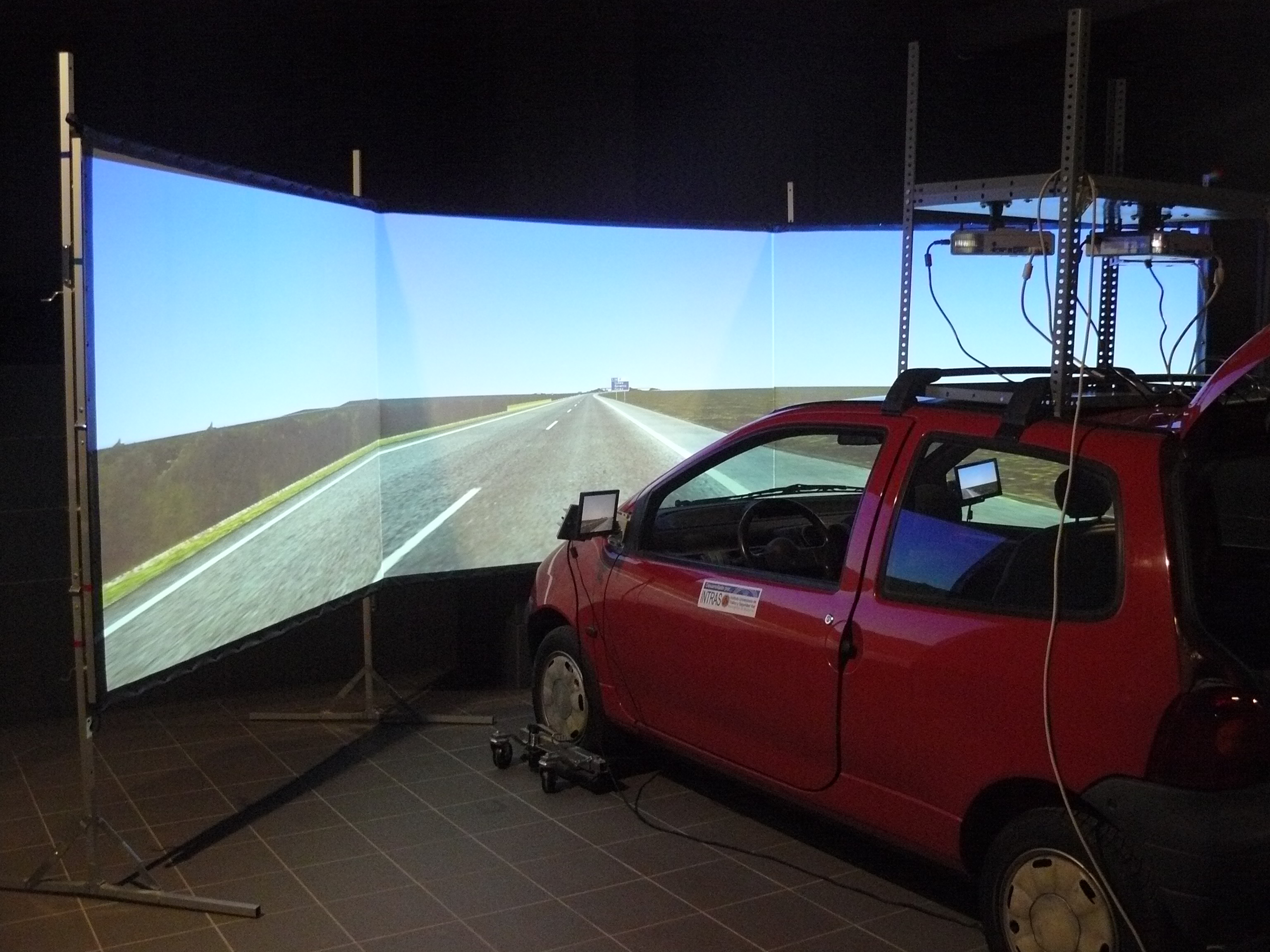
Driver in the Loop (DIL) simulator developed by University of Valencia in Spain, used in evaluation of drivers, roads, in-vehicle information system devices and other areas.

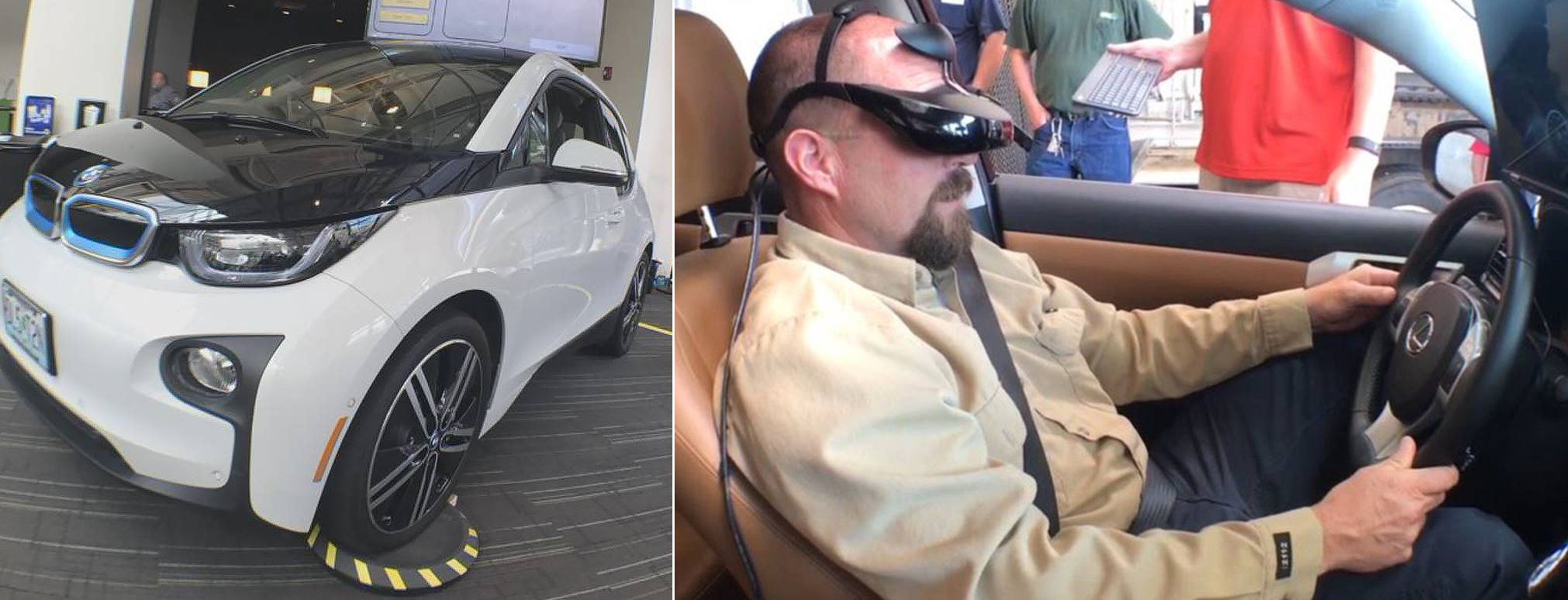
Portable in-vehicle simulator based on a real car and virtual reality glasses (2017).

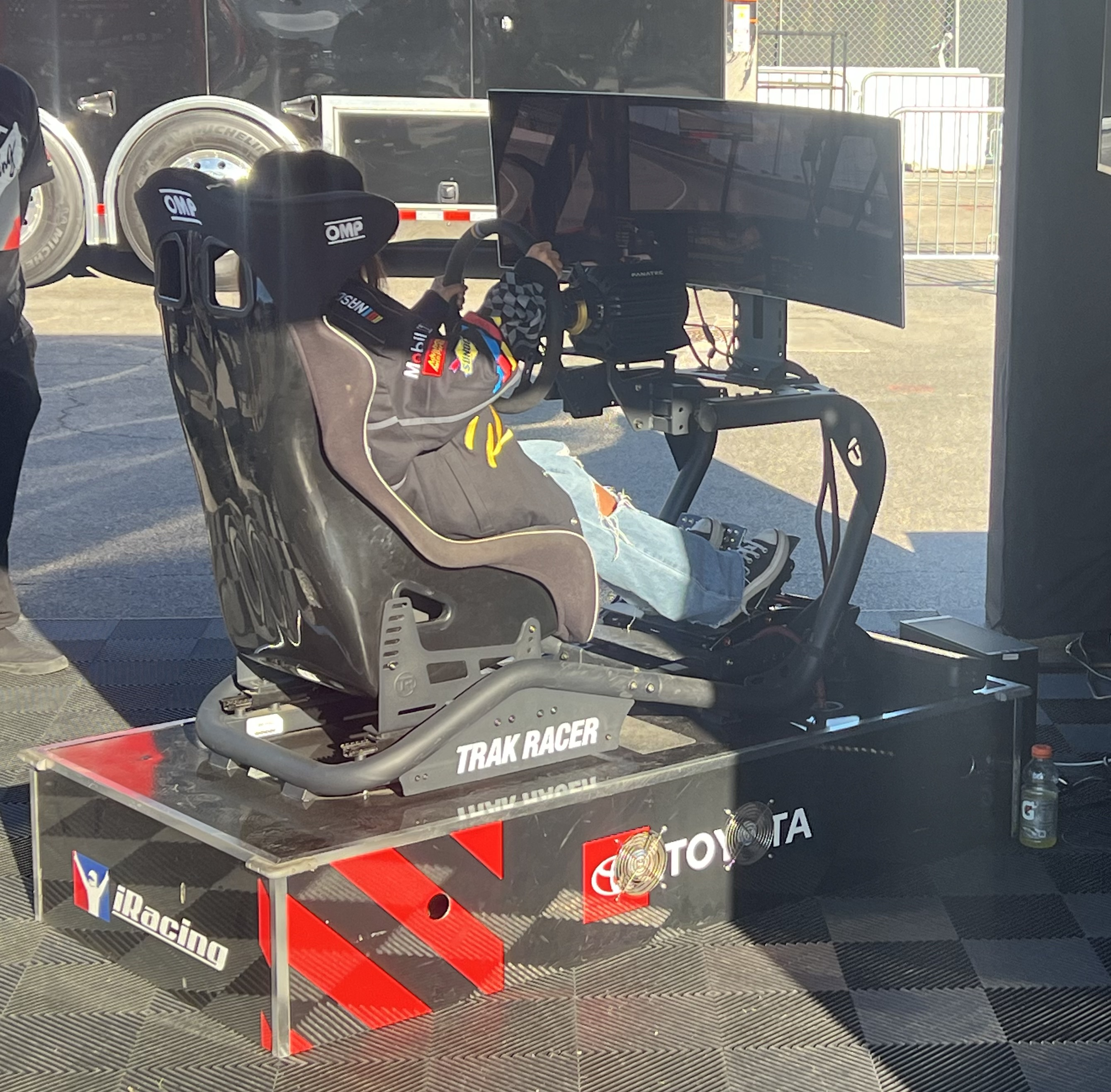
An iRacing simulator on display at Las Vegas Motor Speedway in October 2024.

Driving simulators are used for entertainment as well as in training of driver's education courses taught in educational institutions and private businesses. They are also used for research purposes in the area of human factors and medical research, to monitor driver behavior, performance, and attention and in the car industry to design and evaluate new vehicles or new advanced driver assistance systems.

== Training ==
Driving simulators are being increasingly used for training drivers. Versions exist for cars, trucks, buses, etc.

=== Uses ===
- Novice driver training and testing
- Professional driver training and testing
- Training in critical driving conditions
- Testing the effects of impairment on driver performance
- Analysis of the driver behaviours
- Analysis of driver responses
- Evaluating user performances in different conditions (handling of controls)
- Assessing fitness to drive for aging drivers
- Testing future in-vehicle technologies on drivers or passengers (Human -Machine Interface)
- Entertainment and fun

=== Types ===
- Ambulance simulator: Used to train and assess ambulance drivers in basic and advanced vehicle control skills as well as how to respond to emergencies and interact with other emergency responders.
- Car simulator: Used to train and test novice drivers in all the skills required to pass a driver's license road test as well as hazard perception and crash risk mitigation.
- Modular-design simulator: Interchangeable vehicle cabins or cockpits can be configured for use as tractor/trailer trucks, dump trucks and other construction vehicles, airport-operated vehicles, emergency response and police pursuit vehicles, buses, subway trains, passenger vehicles, and heavy equipment such as cranes.
- Multi-station driving simulator: This type of simulator enables one instructor to train more drivers at the same time thus saving time and reducing costs... These systems are equipped with instructor stations connected to control several driving simulators.
- Truck simulator: Used to train and assess novice and experienced truck drivers in skills ranging from basic control maneuvers, e.g. shifting and backing, to advanced skills, e.g. fuel efficiency, rollover prevention, defensive driving.
- Bus simulator: is used to train bus drivers on route familiarisation, safe driving techniques, fuel efficiency techniques. It can be used for training drivers on a variety of bus models and on different types of gear transmissions.
- Physical simulator: Large scale simulators employ Stewart platforms and xy tables to physically move the driver around in 6-axis space, simulating acceleration, braking and centripetal forces, similar to physical flight simulators.

== Entertainment ==
In the 1980s, it became a trend for arcade racing games to use hydraulic motion simulator arcade cabinets. The trend was sparked by Sega's "taikan" games, with "taikan" meaning "body sensation" in Japanese. The "taikan" trend began when Yu Suzuki's team at Sega (later known as Sega AM2) developed Hang-On (1985), a racing video game where the player sits on and moves a motorbike replica to control the in-game actions. Suzuki's team at Sega followed it with hydraulic motion simulator cockpit cabinets for later racing games such as Out Run (1986). Sega have since continued to manufacture motion simulator cabinets for arcade racing games through to the 2010s.

In 1991, Namco released the arcade game Mitsubishi Driving Simulator, co-developed with Mitsubishi. It was a serious educational street driving simulator that used 3D polygon technology and a sit-down arcade cabinet to simulate realistic driving, including basics such as ensuring the car is in neutral or parking position, starting the engine, placing the car into gear, releasing the hand-brake, and then driving. The player can choose from three routes while following instructions, avoiding collisions with other vehicles or pedestrians, and waiting at traffic lights; the brakes are accurately simulated, with the car creeping forward after taking the foot off the brake until the hand-brake is applied. Leisure Line magazine considered it the "hit of the show" upon its debut at the 1991 JAMMA show. It was designed for use by Japanese driving schools, with a very expensive cost of AU$150,000 or US$117,000 (equivalent to $288,000 in 2025) per unit.

Advances in processing power have led to more realistic simulators known as sim racing games on home systems, beginning with Papyrus Design Group's groundbreaking IndyCar Racing (1993) and Grand Prix Legends (1998) for PC and Gran Turismo (1997) for home consoles.

Occasionally, a racing game or driving simulator will also include an attachable steering wheel that can be used to play the game in place of a controller. The wheel, which is usually plastic, may also include pedals to add to the game's reality. These wheels are usually used only for arcade and computer games.

In addition to the myriad commercial releases, there is an active community of amateur coders working on closed and open source free simulators. Some of the major features popular with fans of the genre are online racing, realism and diversity of cars and tracks.

== Research ==
Driving simulators are used at research facilities for many purposes. Many vehicle manufacturers operate driving simulators, e.g. BMW, Ford, Renault. Many universities also operate simulators for research. Driving simulators allow researchers to study driver training issues and driver behavior under conditions in which it would be illegal and/or unethical to place drivers. For instance, studies of driver distraction would be dangerous and unethical (because of the inability to obtain informed consent from other drivers) to do on the road.

With the increasing use of various in-vehicle information systems (IVIS) such as satellite navigation systems, cell phones, DVD players and e-mail systems, simulators are playing an important rule in assessing the safety and utility of such devices.

=== Fidelity ===
There exists a number of types research driving simulators, with a wide range of capabilities. The most complex, like the National Advanced Driving Simulator, have a full-sized vehicle body, with six-axis movement and 360-degree visual displays. On the other end of the range are simple desktop simulators that are often implemented using a computer monitor for the visual display and a videogame-type steering wheel and pedal input devices. These low cost simulators are used readily in the evaluation of basic and clinically oriented scientific questions. The issue is complicated by political and economic factors, as facilities with low-fidelity simulators claim their systems are "good enough" for the job, while the high-fidelity simulator groups insist that their (considerably more expensive) systems are necessary. Research into motion fidelity indicates that, while some motion is necessary in a research driving simulator, it does not need to have enough range to match real-world forces. Recent research has also considered the use of the real-time photo-realistic video content that reacts dynamically to driver behaviour in the environment.

=== Validity ===
There is a question of validity—whether results obtained in the simulator are applicable to real-world driving. One review of research studies found that driver behavior on a driving simulator approximates (relative validity) but does not exactly replicate (absolute validity) on-road driving behavior. Another study found absolute validity for the types and number of driver errors committed on a simulator and on the road. Yet another study found that drivers who reported impaired performance on a low fidelity driving simulator were significantly more likely to take part in an accident in which the driver was at least partially at fault, within five years after the simulator session. Some research teams are using automated vehicles to recreate simulator studies on a test track, enabling a more direct comparison between the simulator study and the real world. As computers have grown faster and simulation is more widespread in the automotive industry, commercial vehicle math models that have been validated by manufacturers are seeing use in simulators.

== See also ==
- Full motion racing simulator
- Virtual reality simulator
- Sim racing, collective term for auto racing games which aim to be realistic, but do not necessarily include motion simulation output
- Flight simulator
  - Full flight simulator
- Simulator ride
