= Journal of Huntington's Disease =

- Discipline: Huntington's disease
- Language: English
- Edited by: Blair Leavitt, Leslie Thompson

Publication details
- History: 2012–present
- Publisher: IOS Press
- Frequency: Quarterly
- Open access: Hybrid

Standard abbreviations
- ISO 4: J. Huntington's Dis.
- NLM: J Huntingtons Dis

Indexing
- CODEN: JHDOA3
- ISSN: 1879-6397 (print); 1879-6400 (web)
- OCLC no.: 851168422

Links
- Journal homepage; Online access

The Journal of Huntington's Disease is a quarterly peer-reviewed scientific journal in neuroscience that covers all aspects of Huntington's disease and related disorders. It was established in 2012 and is published by IOS Press. The editors-in-chief are Blair Leavitt (University of British Columbia) and Leslie Thompson (UC Irvine).

== Abstracting and indexing ==
The journal is abstracted and indexed in Chemical Abstracts Service, Emerging Sources Citation Index, Index Medicus/MEDLINE/PubMed, and Scopus.
