= Neutron-acceptance diagram shading =

Neutron-acceptance diagram shading (NADS) is a beam simulation technique. Unlike Monte-Carlo simulation codes like McStas, NADS does not trace individual neutrons but traces linearly-related bunches in a reduced-dimensionality phase space. Bunches are subdivided where necessary to follow accurately a simplified surface reflectivity model. The technique has been reported to produce results similar to Monte-Carlo, while requiring substantially less computation time for certain modeling tasks.

== History ==
NADS was born out of necessity. If simulating an instrument takes more than one CPU-day, then performing a full optimisation of a neutron guide hall requires more than two CPU-decades. NADS was designed with the goal of reducing the CPU time to less than one minute for all instrument geometries, making an optimisation of a neutron guide hall feasible within a week on a single desktop computer.

The name NADS arose partly due to referee comments on the original article (ADS is already used widely in Astronomy, the authors should use a different acronym), and partly due to tongue-in-cheek discussions over coffee.

NADS was used with particle-swarm optimisation to design a guide system for the ILL. The new guide system will feed two neutron spin echo instruments, a SANS instrument, a new three-axis spectrometer, a new reflectometer and fundamental physics beamlines at the ILL.

== Speed ==
Due to its speed, NADS is a candidate tool for beam modelling where evolutionary algorithms are used. In tests reported by the developers on the C++ prototype engine could calculate the on-sample flux of a SANS instrument in 55 milliseconds on a single 2 GHz intel core 2 core. The java release (jnads) performs the same calculation in 0.8 seconds on the same hardware. By comparison, a Monte-Carlo simulation of the same instrument was reported to take 25 hours to complete with 1% statistical errors.

Performing the same, unoptimised SANS simulation with full beam monitors in jnads (i.e. not just calculating the on-sample flux) was reported to take about 45 seconds on the same hardware, which provides an indication of both bead divergence and homogeneity at the same time.

== Reliability ==
NADS results are generally in excellent agreement with Monte-Carlo calculations. In strictly controlled tests, NADS and Monte-Carlo both produced identical results when simulating a SANS instrument. To date, no discrepancy has been found.

== Limitations ==
- It is strictly monochromatic (but you can get away with a 15% spread typical of velocity selectors)
- Your instrument must have independent horizontal and vertical planes. No crosstalk.
- Polarisation and time-of-flight are further complications that users have to consider manually. It is not a black box technique

NADS provides the neutron flux. To calculate the neutron beam current NADS result must be multiplied by the wavelength band width.
