= Margaret-Anne Storey =

Canadian computer scientist

Margaret-Anne Darragh Storey is a Canadian computer scientist and a professor of computer science at the University of Victoria, where she holds the Canada Research Chair in Human and Social Aspects of Software Engineering.

== Education and career ==
Storey has a 1993 bachelor's degree from the University of Victoria, and completed her Ph.D. at Simon Fraser University in 1998. Her dissertation, A Cognitive Framework for Describing and Evaluating Software Evaluation Tools, was jointly supervised by Hausi A. Muller and F. David Fracchia.

As a professor at the University of Victoria, Storey was given a tier 2 Canada Research Chair in Human Computer Interaction in 2005. She was given another tier 1 Canada Research Chair in Human and Social Aspects of Software Engineering in 2015. It was renewed in 2022.

== Recognition ==
Storey visited Lund University in Sweden as Lise Meitner Guest Professor from 2016 to 2018, and in 2025 was given an honorary doctorate by Lund University.

She was elected to the Royal Society of Canada in 2025.
