= Sourcetrail =

Software visualization tool

- Developer: The Sourcetrail Development Team
- Stable release: 2021.4.19
- Operating system: Multiplatform
- Type: Software quality
- License: GNU General Public License v3.0
- Repository: github.com/CoatiSoftware/Sourcetrail

Sourcetrail was a FOSS source code explorer that provided interactive dependency graphs and support for multiple programming languages including C, C++, Java and Python.

== History ==
The project was started by Eberhard Gräther after an internship at Google where he worked on Google Chrome, and noticed that he consumed a lot of time (1 month) to implement a simple feature that he expected to be done in 1–2 hours. This was his motivation to develop a tool that helps in understanding the consequences of source code modifications. The project started as a commercial project in 2016 under the name Coati. In November 2019, Sourcetrail was released as open-source software under version three of the GNU General Public License.

The project was discontinued in 2021.

== Concept ==
Most of a programmer's time is invested in reading the source code. Therefore, Sourcetrail was intended to help the developers to understand the source code and the relationship between different components. Sourcetrail builds a dependency graph after indexing the source code files and provides a graphical overview of the source code.

== See also ==
- Software visualization
