= IBM Rational Rose =

Software

Rational Rose
- Developer: Rational Software
- Release: 1994
- Stable release: 7.0
- Operating system: Microsoft Windows, Linux, UNIX
- Available in: English
- Type: Diagram management (UML and ER)
- License: IBM EULA
- Website: www.ibm.com/support/pages/ibm-rational-rose-enterprise-7004-ifix001

Rational Rose was a development environment for Unified Modeling Language. It integrates with Microsoft Visual Studio .NET and Rational Application Developer. The Rational Software division of IBM, which previously produced Rational Rose, wrote this software.

It was initially release in 1994. In 2006 it replaced IBM's “XDE” family of products. The UML capabilities were superseded by Rational Software Architect around 2006. The ER modelling part has been superseded as of 2011. IBM no longer sells Rational Rose.

== Description ==
The Rational Rose family of products is a set of UML modeling tools for software design. Rational Rose could also use source-based reverse engineering; the combination of this capability with source generation from diagrams was dubbed roundtrip engineering. However, other UML tools are also capable of this, including Borland Together, ESS-Model, BlueJ, and Fujaba.

The Rational Rose family allows integration with legacy integrated development environments or languages. For more modern architectures, Rational Software Architect and Rational Software Modeler were developed. These products were created matching and surpassing Rose XDE capabilities to include support for UML 2.x, pattern customization support, the latest programming languages and approaches to software development such as SOA, and more powerful data modeling that supports entity-relationship (ER) modeling.

A 2003 UML 2 For Dummies book wrote that Rational Rose suite was the "market (and marketing) leader."

== History ==
With the Rational June 2006 Product Release, IBM withdrew the “XDE” family of products and introduced the Rational Rose family of products as replacements.

The UML capabilities were superseded by Rational Software Architect around 2006, with Rational Rose becoming a legacy product. As of 2011, the ER modelling part (Rational Rose Data Modeler) has been superseded by another IBM product—Rational Data Architect.

As of 2025, IBM no longer sells Rational Rose, with all mentions except support pages being removed from the website.

== See also ==
- Imagix 4D
- Rigi
- list of UML tools
