= IOS Press =

Publishing house

- Parent company: Sage
- Founded: 1987
- Country of origin: Netherlands
- Headquarters location: Amsterdam
- Distribution: Books: Baker & Taylor (United States); Co Info (Australia) multiple distributors (Asia); Journals: EBSCO (United States); Globe Publication (India); Maruzen, Kinokuniya (Japan)
- Publication types: Books, Journals
- Nonfiction topics: Scientific, technical, and medical research
- Official website: www.iospress.com

IOS Press is a publishing house headquartered in Amsterdam, specialising in the publication of journals and books related to fields of scientific, technical, and medical (STM) research. It was established in 1987 by Einar Fredriksson with a strong focus on computer science and artificial intelligence. IOS Press has since diversified to include basic sciences and medicine. IOS Press publishes around 90 international journals and releases about 70 book titles annually, covering fields such as computer science, mathematics, the natural sciences, and topics within medicine.

== History ==
A subsidiary based in the United States (IOS Press, Inc.) was created in 1990, based in the Washington, D.C. area. In the 1990s, IOS Press partnered with Ohmsha Ltd. (Japan) and re-established the Akademische Verlagsgesellschaft AKA GmbH a.k.a. AKA-Verlag (Germany). Other co-publishing and joint venture relationships have been formed to extend IOS Press' academic publishing coverage between Germany, Japan and China.

IOS Press expanded to acquire the publications list of Delft University Press (Netherlands) in 2005, and has since explored open access initiatives for books and journals through TU Delft. IOS Press publishes a number of peer-reviewed open access journals, including In Silico Biology, Information Knowledge Systems Management, Journal on Satisfiability, Boolean Modeling and Computation and Journal of Pediatric Rehabilitation Medicine.

IOS Press is a member of the International Association of Scientific, Technical, and Medical Publishers (STM). IOS Press is a signatory of the SDG Publishers Compact, and has taken steps to support the achievement of the Sustainable Development Goals (SDGs) in the publishing industry. In 2023 the company was acquired by Sage.

== Journals ==
IOS publishes over 90 journals, including:

- Biorheology
- Fundamenta Informaticae
- ICGA Journal
- Information Services & Use
- Journal of Alzheimer's Disease
- Journal of Huntington's Disease
- Journal of Parkinson's Disease
- NeuroRehabilitation
- Journal of Neutron Research
- Semantic Web
