= University of Iowa Driving Safety Research Institute =

Coordinates: 41.7080°N 91.6017°W

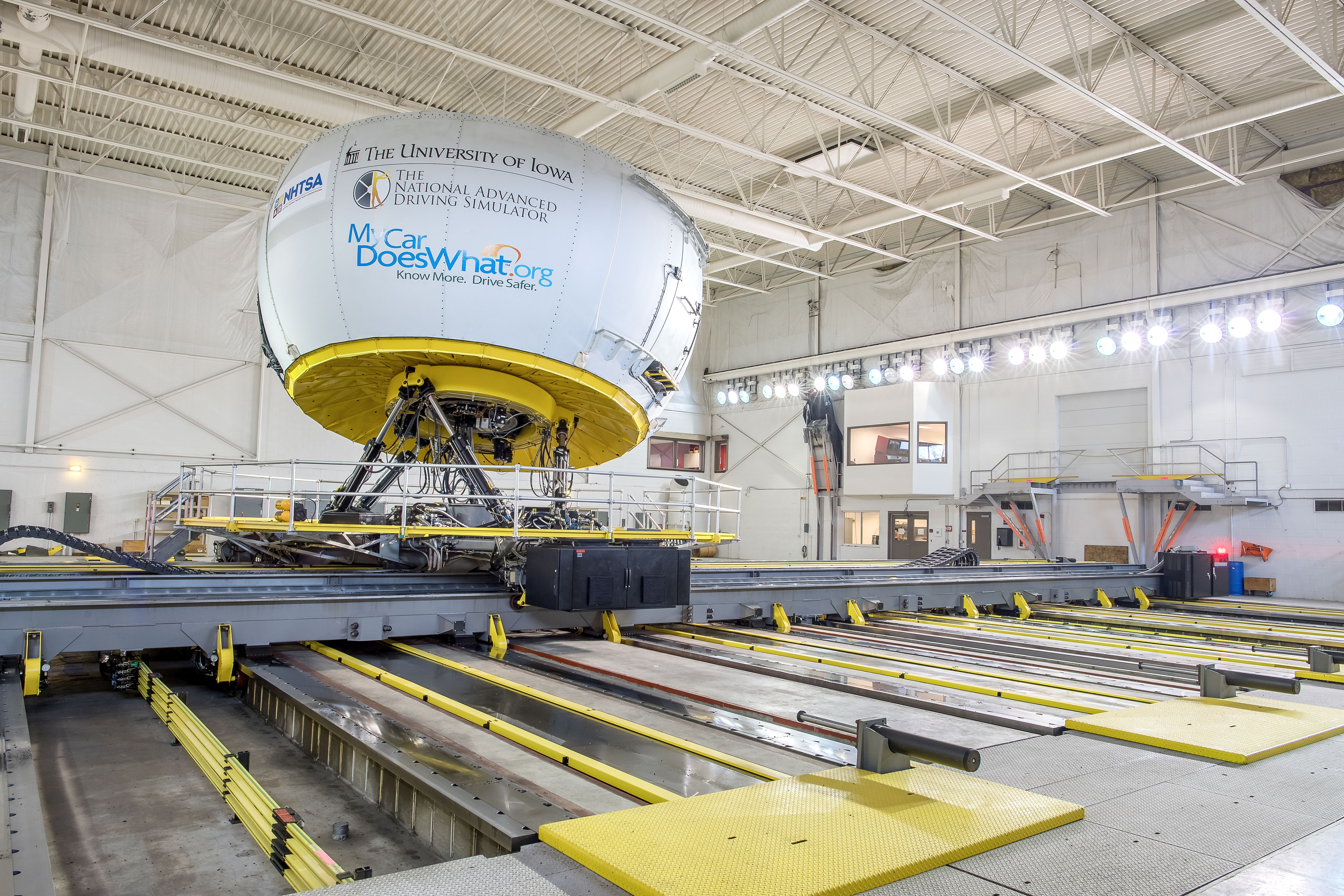
National Advanced Driving Simulator in 2017

The Driving Safety Research Institute (DSRI) at the University of Iowa College of Engineering houses the National Advanced Driving Simulator (NADS-1) and a fleet of instrumented on-road research vehicles. The NADS-1 is one of the largest ground vehicle driving simulators in the world.

The National Highway Traffic Safety Administration (NHTSA) owns the NADS-1 simulator, while the University of Iowa takes responsibility for operation and maintenance.

In 2024, the institute received funding from NHTSA for a project assessing driver monitoring systems' effectiveness at determining the level of impairment.

== Mission ==
Make roads safer by researching the connection between humans and vehicles

== Driving research ==
The Driving Safety Research Institute conducts research with both simulators and on-road vehicles. Funded by government, military, and industry partners, their expertise includes:

- Human factors
- Distracted driving
- Drowsy driving
- Drugged driving
- Connected and automated vehicles
- Mobility
- At-risk populations (older and novice drivers)
- Simulation science
- Crash biomechanics
- Safety and crash data analysis

== Simulators ==
NADS-1 simulator: One of the world’s most realistic driving simulators

NADS-2 simulator: A fixed-base simulator with high-resolution graphics

miniSim™: A low-cost PC-based portable simulator available for purchase

 

== On-road research vehicles ==
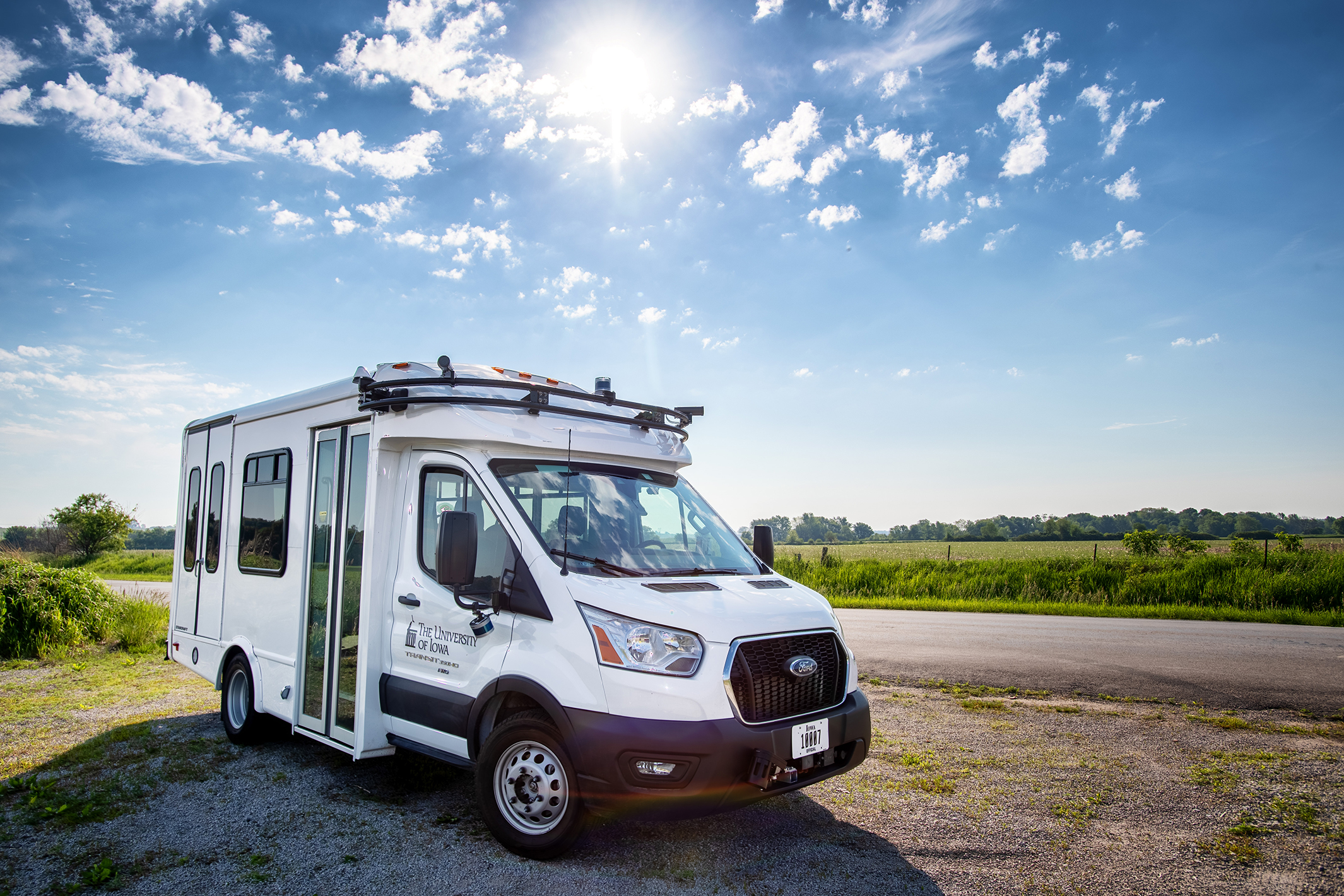
The Ford Transit shuttle bus is the newest vehicle in the DSRI fleet and was purchased for the ADS for Rural America project.

The Driving Safety Research Institute's faculty and staff utilize a fleet of on-road, custom instrumented vehicles to conduct driving research:

- Ford Transit shuttle bus
- Tesla Model S75D
- Lincoln MKZ
- Volvo XC90
- Toyota Camry XLE

Additionally, DSRI often receives vehicles as long-term loans from vehicle manufacturers and other partnering organizations for research. All vehicles are maintained in-house, with the University of Iowa, or in cooperation with partnering manufacturers/organizations.

== History ==
The NADS-1 was developed from 1996 through 2001 by the National Highway Traffic Safety Administration (NHTSA) to conduct human factors research on driver behavior.

1992

NHTSA selects the University of Iowa to house the National Advanced Driving Simulator (NADS-1 simulator), which would become the most sophisticated research driving simulator in the world at the time.

1994

The first automated driving simulations in the world are done at the University of Iowa on the Iowa Driving Simulator, predecessor to the NADS-1. Forward collision warning and adaptive cruise control (ACC) systems are designed, developed, and tested for NHTSA.

1997

The University of Iowa (UI) begins building virtual replicas of military proving grounds, such as the Aberdeen Proving Ground in Maryland, where the government tests military vehicles.

1998

Ground is broken for the new NADS facility.

1999

UI begins first drugged driving study: “Effects of Fexofenadine, Diphenhydramine, and Alcohol on Driving Performance.”

2001 (fall)

NADS-1 is operational. The facility is operated on a self-sustaining basis by the UI. NHTSA owns the simulator while the UI takes responsibility for operation and maintenance. UI owns the building, land, and the software that runs the NADS-1.

2001

The first formal study done on the NADS-1 is a study on tire failure and loss of control.

2002

A wireless phone study is conducted—the first at NADS about driver distraction.

2003

NADS begins work with John Deere, and a tractor cab is created for use in the NADS-1 simulator.

2005

NADS builds a portable simulator for outreach to high school students, which eventually leads to the creation of the miniSim program in 2009.

2006

The NADS-2 simulator—the second simulator at the facility—is ready for business.

Based partially on research done at the UI, NHTSA mandates that all new vehicles must have electronic stability control.

2011

The first cannabis study on driving performance is conducted at NADS.

The first on-road vehicle is purchased for DSRI research, a Toyota Camry.

2013

The UI is awarded a grant that would grow to $11.2 million over eight years from the U.S. DOT to fund SAFER-SIM: Safety Research Using Simulation.

2015

MyCarDoesWhat.org campaign launched to educate consumers about advanced driver assistance systems.

2016–2018

Partially-automated vehicles are added to the NADS fleet: a Volvo XC90, Tesla Model S75D, and Lincoln MKZ.

2019

U.S. DOT awards NADS a $7 million grant for the Automated Driving Systems for Rural America project.

2023

The research institute officially changes its name from the University of Iowa National Advanced Driving Simulator (NADS) to the Driving Safety Research Institute (DSRI) to better reflect their expertise in both simulation and in on-road research. The National Advanced Driving Simulator name is retained for the suite of simulators.
