= Ershov Computer =

- Developer: Dmitry Kalashnikov
- Release: July 2026
- Written in: JavaScript
- Operating system: Web application
- Type: Educational software
- Website: ershovcomputer.ru/en/

Ershov Computer (Russian: «Компьютер Ершова») is a Russian browser-based educational simulator of digital logic and computer architecture. It was developed by Dmitry Kalashnikov, a graduate of Novosibirsk State University. Users assemble logic circuits and an 8-bit processor, then program the result in a built-in assembly language.

== History ==
The project was publicly described in July 2026 by the Russian technology publications CNews and Computerra. It is named after the Soviet computer scientist Andrey Ershov. A basic version is available free of charge in a web browser.

== Description ==
The simulator is organised as 47 exercises. Users begin with AND, OR and NOT gates and then construct adders, flip-flops and an arithmetic logic unit. Later exercises involve an 8-bit Harvard architecture processor and assembly-language programs.

Circuit behaviour is checked against a truth table. Completing exercises without automated assistance awards an in-game currency called "transistors".
