= Atre =

Atre or Atri (Athri) is a Hindu patronymic surname and gotra from the ancient sage. In Maharashtra, the surname is mainly found among Marathi Brahmins. In Uttar Pradesh & Gujarat, the surname is found among Yadavs. It is also a gotra in the Konkani Gaud Saraswat Brahmin community

Notable people with the surname includes

- Pralhad Keshav Atre (1898–1969), Marathi Brahmin writer, poet, educationist, movie producer–director–script writer and orator
- Shubhangi Atre, Indian television actress
- Prabha Atre, Indian classical vocalist from the Kirana gharana
- Shaku Atre (born 1940), Indian-born American data scientist and businesswoman
- Rasheed Attre (Atre), Pakistani music director & composer
- Wajahat Attre (Atre), Pakistani music director & composer
