= List of computing people =

This is a list of people who are important or notable in the field of computing, but who are not primarily computer scientists or programmers.

== A ==
- Alfred Aho, co-developer of the AWK
- Leonard Adleman, encryption (RSA)
- Marc Andreessen, co-founder of Netscape Communications Corporation

== B ==
- Tim Berners-Lee, inventor of the World Wide Web
- Stephen Bourne, developer of the Bourne shell

== C ==
- John Carmack, realtime computer game graphics, id Software
- Noam Chomsky, linguist, language theorist (Chomsky hierarchy) and social critic

== D ==
- Theo de Raadt, founder of the OpenBSD and OpenSSH projects

== E ==
- J. Presper Eckert, ENIAC
- Larry Ellison, co-founder of Oracle Corporation
- Marc Ewing, creator of Red Hat Linux

== G ==
- Bill Gates, co-founder and Chairman of Microsoft
- James Gosling, "father" of the Java programming language

== H ==
- Grace Hopper, she was a pioneer of computer programming who invented one of the first linkers.

== I ==
- Jonathan Ive, Senior Vice President of Industrial Design at Apple

== J ==
- Steve Jobs, co-founder and CEO of Apple
- Bill Joy, co-founder of Sun Microsystems, BSD

== K ==
- Brian Kernighan, Dennis Ritchie, C programming language
- Donald Knuth, The Art of Computer Programming, TeX

== L ==
- Rasmus Lerdorf, creator of the PHP Scripting Language
- Lawrence Lessig, professor of law and founder of the Creative Commons
- Ada Lovelace

== M ==
- John William Mauchly, ENIAC
- John McCarthy, LISP programming language
- Bob Miner, co-founder of Oracle Corporation
- Marvin Minsky, AI luminary
- Gordon E. Moore, co-founder of Intel, Moore's Law
- Elon Musk, co-founder of PayPal, Tesla, Inc, SpaceX,

== N ==
- Roger Needham
- John von Neumann, theoretical computer science
- Robert Noyce, co-founder of Intel and the founder of integrated circuit

== P ==
- Sir John Anthony Pople, pioneer in computational chemistry
- Jon Postel, Internet pioneer, founder of IANA

== R ==
- Eric Raymond, Open source movement luminary
- Dennis Ritchie, Unix operating system and C programming language
- Ron Rivest, encryption (RSA)
- Guido van Rossum, Python (programming language) Benevolent Dictator For Life

== S ==
- Adi Shamir, encryption (RSA)
- Mark Shuttleworth, founder of Canonical
- Richard Stallman, founder of GNU
- Olaf Storaasli, NASA Finite element machine
- Bjarne Stroustrup, founder of C++

== T ==
- Ken Thompson, Unix and Plan 9 operating systems
- Linus Torvalds, Linux
- Alan Turing, British mathematician and cryptographer

== W ==
- Prof. Joseph Weizenbaum, computer critic
- Kevin Warwick, cyborg scientist, implant self-experimenter
- Niklaus Wirth, developed Pascal
- Peter J. Weinberger, co-developer of the AWK language
- Sophie Wilson, designer of the ARM instruction set
- Stephen Wolfram, founder of Wolfram Research, physicist, software developer, mathematician
- Steve Wozniak, co-founder of Apple; creator of the Apple I and Apple II computers

== Z ==
- Jill Zimmerman, James M. Beall Professor of Mathematics and Computer Science at Goucher College
- Konrad Zuse, built one of the first computers
- Mark Zuckerberg, co-founder of Facebook

== See also ==
- List of programmers
- List of computer scientists
- List of pioneers in computer science
- List of Russian IT developers
