= Marek Karpinski =

American computer scientist

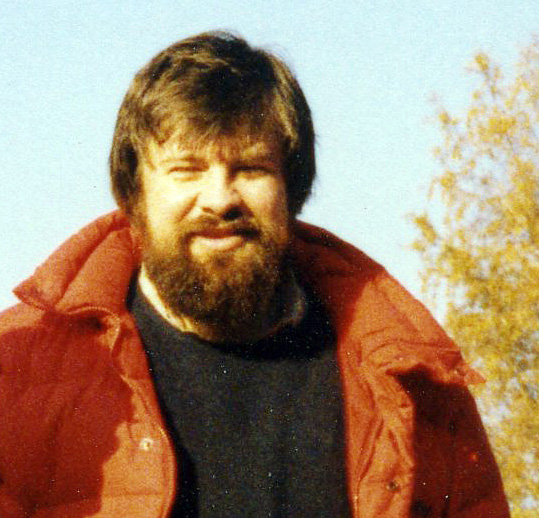
Marek Karpinski in Oberwolfach, 2007

Marek Karpinski is a computer scientist and mathematician known for his research in the theory of algorithms and their applications, combinatorial optimization, computational complexity, and mathematical foundations. He is a recipient of several research prizes in the above areas.

He is currently a Professor of Computer Science, and the Head of the Algorithms Group at the University of Bonn. He is also a member of Bonn International Graduate School in Mathematics BIGS and the Hausdorff Center for Mathematics.

== See also ==
- List of computer scientists
- List of mathematicians
