= Peg solitaire =

Board game for one player

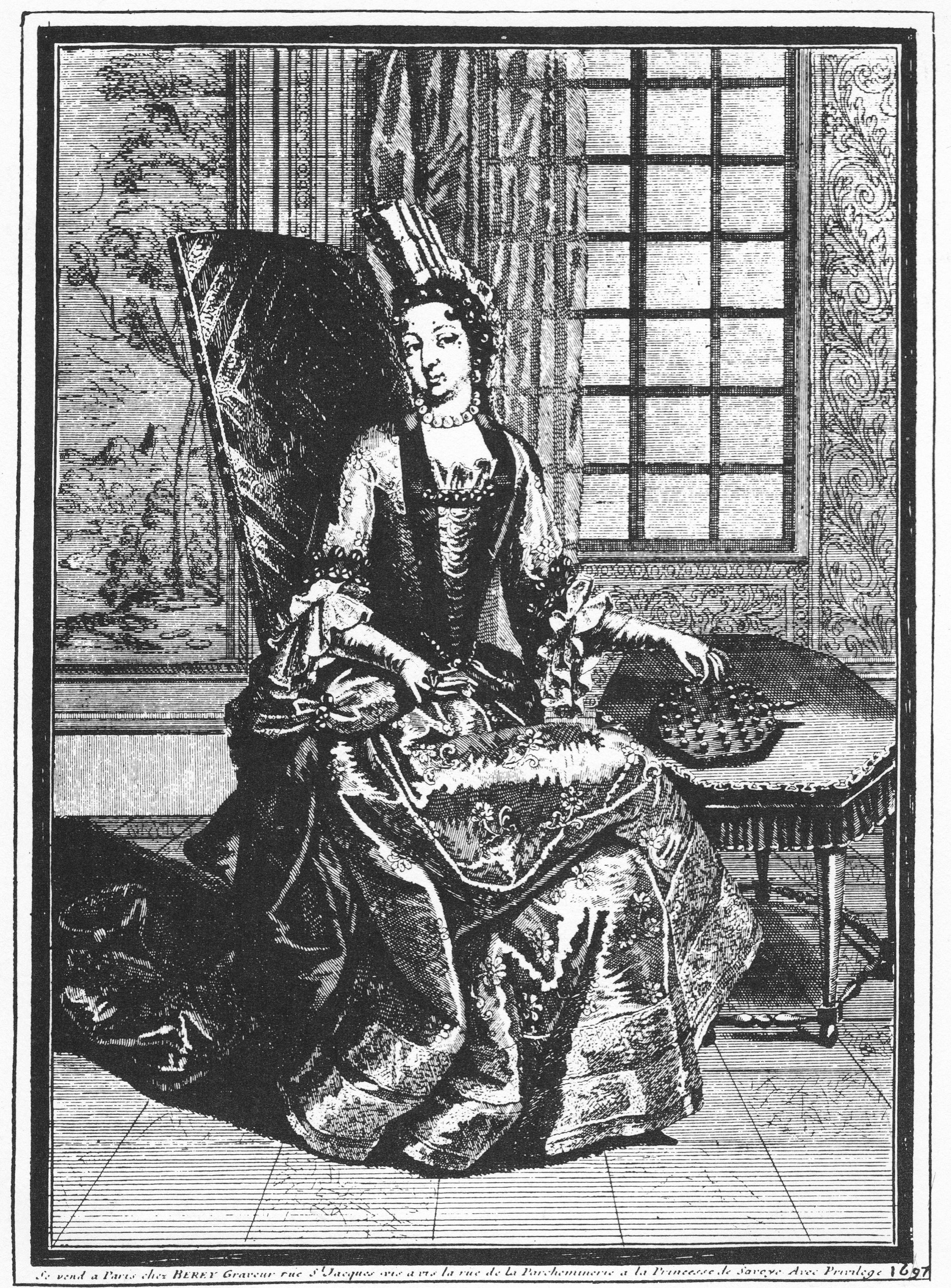
The Princess of Soubise playing peg solitaire, 1697

Peg solitaire, solo noble, solo goli, marble solitaire or simply solitaire is a board game for one player involving movement of pegs on a board with holes. Some sets use marbles in a board with indentations. The game is known as solitaire in Britain and as peg solitaire in the US where 'solitaire' refers to the family of card games.

The first evidence of the game can be traced back to the court of Louis XIV, and the specific date of 1697, with an engraving made ten years later by Claude Auguste Berey of Anne de Rohan-Chabot, Princess of Soubise, with the puzzle by her side. The August 1697 edition of the French literary magazine Mercure galant contains a description of the board, rules and sample problems. This is the first known reference to the game in print.

The standard game fills the entire board with pegs except for the central hole. The objective is, making valid moves, to empty the entire board except for a solitary peg in the central hole.

== Board ==
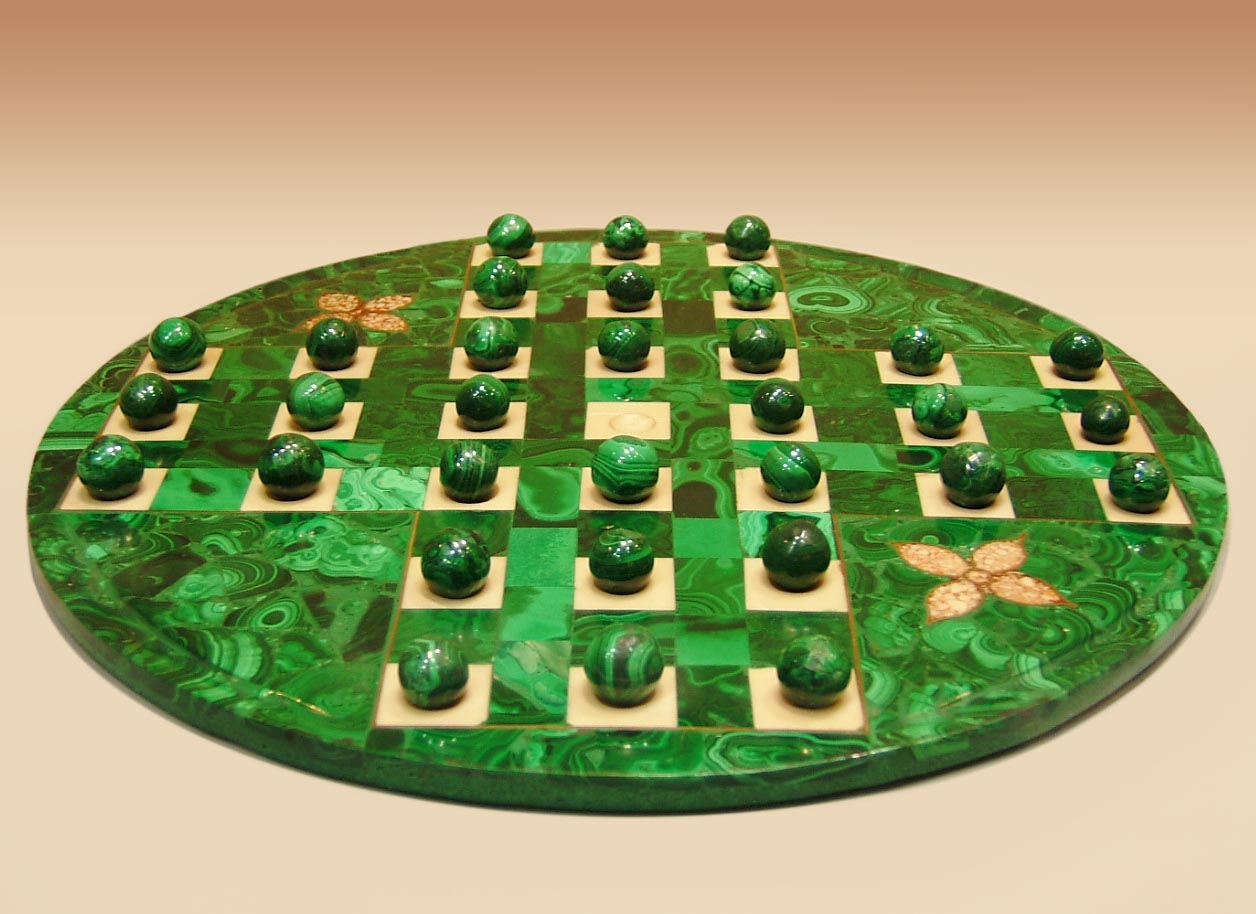
English peg solitaire board

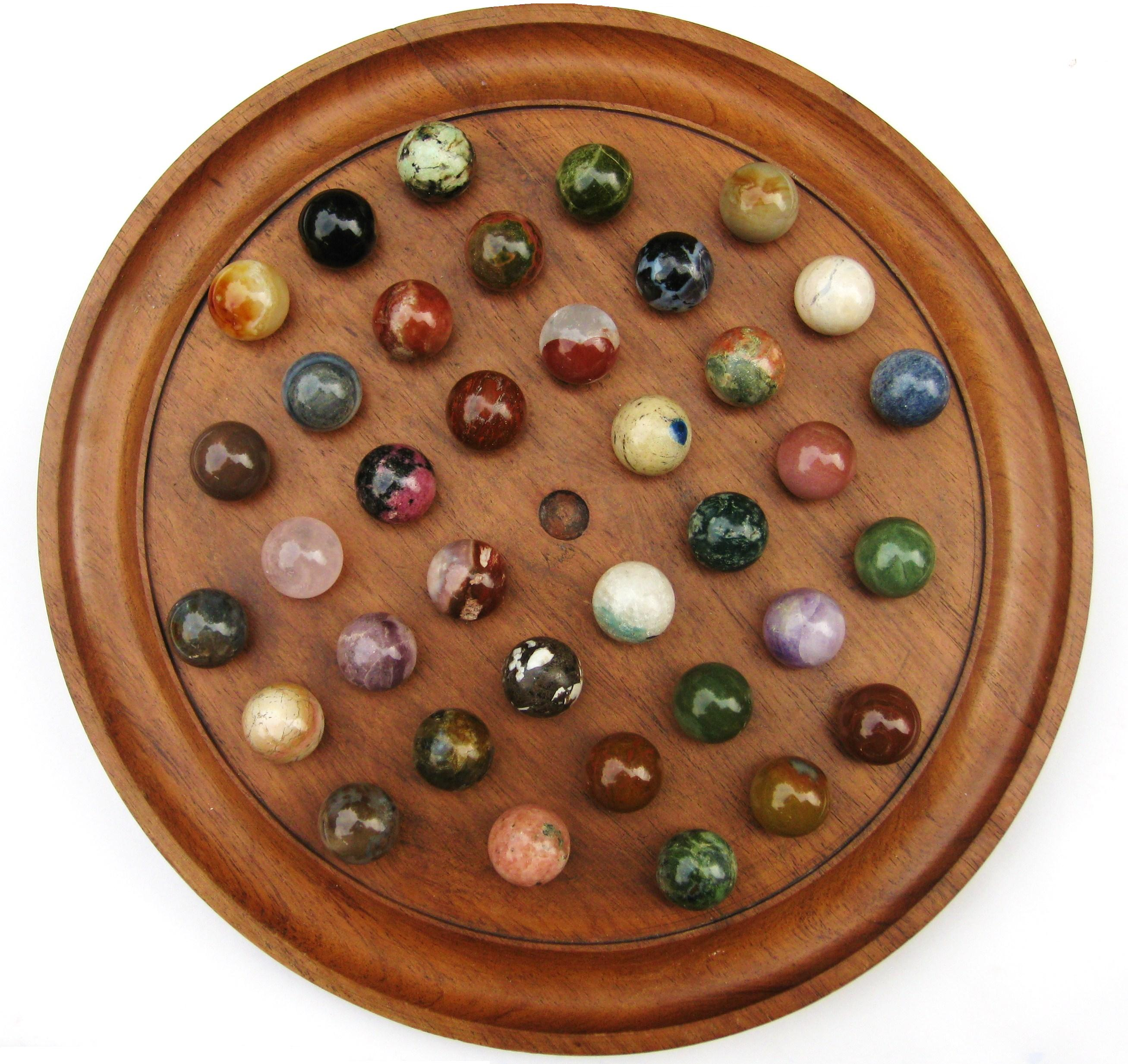
European peg solitaire board

There are two traditional boards ('⚫' as an initial peg, '⚪' as an initial hole):

English	European
English peg-solitaire board	European peg-solitaire board

== Play ==
Playing Peg solitaire

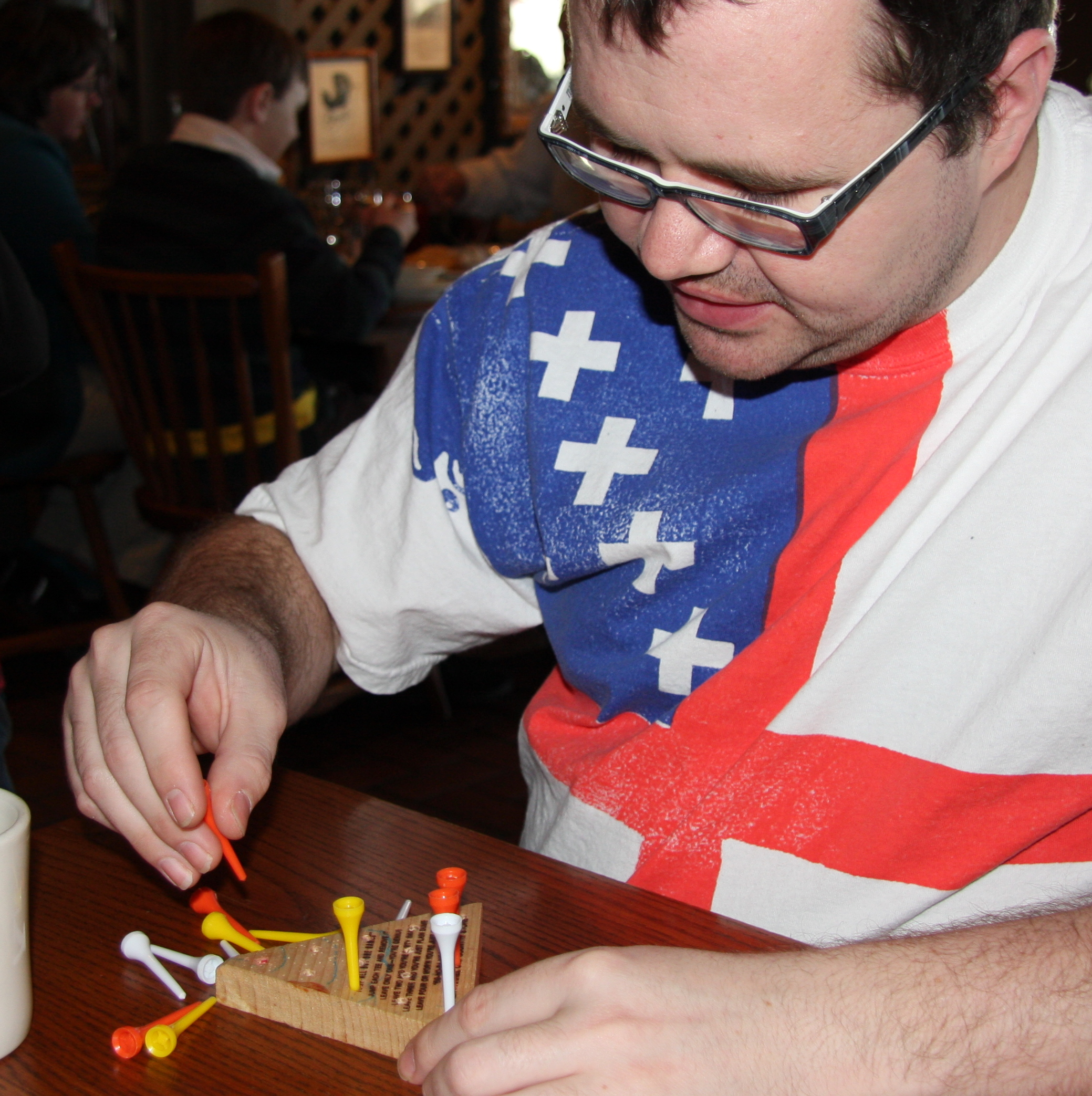
Man playing triangular peg solitaire

A valid move is to jump a peg orthogonally over an adjacent peg into a hole two positions away and then to remove the jumped peg.

In the diagrams which follow, ⚪ indicates an empty hole, and ⚫ indicates a peg in a hole, which is circled in black when it is about to be moved, and in red when it was just moved. The hole it was just moved from is in light blue, and a red hole with a red X indicates the hole of the peg that was jumped and removed.

Thus valid moves in each of the four orthogonal directions are:

- Before
  →
  Jump to right
- Before
  →
  Jump to left
- Before
  →
  Jump down
- Before
  →
  Jump up

On an English board, the first three moves might be:

Start
→
After move 1
→
After move 2
→
After move 3

== Strategy ==
There are many different solutions to the standard problem, and one notation used to describe them assigns letters to the holes (although numbers may also be used):

English	European
abc def ghijklm nopxPON MLKJIHG FED CBA English board notation	abc ydefz ghijklm nopxPON MLKJIHG ZFEDY CBA European board notation

This mirror image notation is used, amongst other reasons, since on the European board, one set of alternative games is to start with a hole at some position and to end with a single peg in its mirrored position. On the English board the equivalent alternative games are to start with a hole and end with a peg at the same position.

There is no solution to the European board with the initial hole centrally located, if only orthogonal moves are permitted. This is easily seen as follows, by an argument from Hans Zantema. Divide the positions of the board into A, B and C positions as follows (each 'diagonal' is assigned the same letter, and they go through the sequence ABC repeatedly):

ABC
ABCAB
ABCABCA
BCABCAB
CABCABC
BCABC
ABC
Classification of the European board into A, B and C positions

Initially with only the central position free, the number of covered A positions is 12, the number of covered B positions is 12, and also the number of covered C positions is 12. After every move the number of covered A positions increases or decreases by one, and the same for the number of covered B positions and the number of covered C positions. Hence after an even number of moves all these three numbers are even, and after an odd number of moves all these three numbers are odd. Hence a final position with only one peg cannot be reached, since that would require that one of these numbers is one (the position of the peg, one is odd), while the other two numbers are zero, hence even.

There are, however, several other configurations where a single initial hole can be reduced to a single peg.

A tactic that can be used is to divide the board into packages of three and to purge (remove) them entirely using one extra peg, the catalyst, that jumps out and then jumps back again. In the example below, the * is the catalyst:

Start
→
Catalyst jumps out
→
Middle purge
→
Catalyst jumps back

This technique can be used with a line of 3, a block of 2·3 and a 6-peg L shape with a base of length 3 and upright of length 4.

Other alternate games include starting with two empty holes and finishing with two pegs in those holes. Also starting with one hole here and ending with one peg there. On an English board, the hole can be anywhere and the final peg can only end up where multiples of three permit. Thus a hole at a can only leave a single peg at a, p, O or C.

=== Studies on peg solitaire ===
A thorough analysis of the game is known. This analysis introduced a notion called pagoda function which is a strong tool to show the infeasibility of a given generalized peg solitaire problem.

A solution for finding a pagoda function, which demonstrates the infeasibility of a given problem, is formulated as a linear programming problem and solvable in polynomial time.

A paper in 1990 dealt with the generalized Hi-Q problems which are equivalent to the peg solitaire problems and showed their NP-completeness.

A 1996 paper formulated a peg solitaire problem as a combinatorial optimization problem and discussed the properties of the feasible region called 'a solitaire cone'.

In 1999 peg solitaire was completely solved on a computer using an exhaustive search through all possible variants. It was achieved making use of the symmetries, efficient storage of board constellations and hashing.

In 2001 an efficient method for solving peg solitaire problems was developed.

An unpublished study from 1989 on a generalized version of the game on the English board showed that each possible problem in the generalized game has 2^{9} possible distinct solutions, excluding symmetries, as the English board contains 9 distinct 3×3 sub-squares. One consequence of this analysis is to put a lower bound on the size of possible "inverted position" problems, in which the cells initially occupied are left empty and vice versa. Any solution to such a problem must contain a minimum of 11 moves, irrespective of the exact details of the problem.

It can be proved using abstract algebra that there are only 5 fixed board positions where the game can successfully end with one peg.

=== Solutions to the English game ===
Interactive solution guide for English Peg Solitaire.

The shortest solution to the standard English game involves 18 moves, counting multiple jumps as single moves:

Shortest solution to English peg solitaire
e-x
l-j
c-k
P-f
D-P
G-I
J-H
m-G-I
i-k
g-i
L-J-H-l-j-h
C-K
p-F
A-C-K
M-g-i
a-c-k-I
d-p-F-D-P-p
o-x

The order of some of the moves can be exchanged. Note that if you instead think of ⚫ as a hole and ⚪ as a peg, you can solve the puzzle by following the solution in reverse, starting from the last picture, going towards the first. However, this requires more than 18 moves.

This solution was found in 1912 by Ernest Bergholt and proven to be the shortest possible by John Beasley in 1964.

Other solutions include the following list. In these, the notation used is

- List of starting holes
- Colon
- List of end target pegs
- Equals sign
- Source peg and destination hole (the pegs jumped over are left as an exercise to the reader)
- , or / (a slash is used to separate 'chunks' such as a six-purge out)

 x:x=ex,lj,ck,Pf,DP,GI,JH,mG,GI,ik,gi,LJ,JH,Hl,lj,jh,CK,pF,AC,CK,Mg,gi,ac,ck,kI,dp,pF,FD,DP,Pp,ox
 x:x=ex,lj,xe/hj,Ki,jh/ai,ca,fd,hj,ai,jh/MK,gM,hL,Fp,MK,pF/CK,DF,AC,JL,CK,LJ/PD,GI,mG,JH,GI,DP/Ox
 j:j=lj,Ik,jl/hj,Ki,jh/mk,Gm,Hl,fP,mk,Pf/ai,ca,fd,hj,ai,jh/MK,gM,hL,Fp,MK,pF/CK,DF,AC,JL,CK,LJ/Jj
 i:i=ki,Jj,ik/lj,Ik,jl/AI,FD,CA,HJ,AI,JH/mk,Hl,Gm,fP,mk,Pf/ai,ca,fd,hj,ai,jh/gi,Mg,Lh,pd,gi,dp/Ki
 e:e=xe/lj,Ik,jl/ck,ac,df,lj,ck,jl/GI,lH,mG,DP,GI,PD/AI,FD,CA,JH,AI,HJ/pF,MK,gM,JL,MK,Fp/hj,ox,xe
 d:d=fd,xe,df/lj,ck,ac,Pf,ck,jl/DP,KI,PD/GI,lH,mG,DP,GI,PD/CK,DF,AC,LJ,CK,JL/MK,gM,hL,pF,MK,Fp/pd
 b:b=jb,lj/ck,ac,Pf,ck/DP,GI,mG,JH,GI,PD/LJ,CK,JL/MK,gM,hL,pF,MK,Fp/xo,dp,ox/xe/AI/BJ,JH,Hl,lj,jb
 b:x=jb,lj/ck,ac,Pf,ck/DP,GI,mG,JH,GI,PD/LJ,CK,JL/MK,gM,hL,pF,MK,Fp/xo,dp,ox/xe/AI/BJ,JH,Hl,lj,ex
 a:a=ca,jb,ac/lj,ck,jl/Ik,pP,KI,lj,Ik,jl/GI,lH,mG,DP,GI,PD/CK,DF,AC,LJ,CK,JL/dp,gi,pd,Mg,Lh,gi/ia
 a:p=ca,jb,ac/lj,ck,jl/Ik,pP,KI,lj,Ik,jl/GI,lH,mG,DP,GI,PD/CK,DF,AC,LJ,CK,JL/dp,gi,pd,Mg,Lh,gi/dp

An easily remembered solution of first clearing edges by focusing on the holes circled in white – in figure 1, pegs are labelled in the order they are removed

=== Brute force attack on standard English peg solitaire ===
The only place it is possible to end up with a solitary peg is the centre, or the middle of one of the edges; on the last jump, there will always be an option of choosing whether to end in the centre or the edge.

Following is a table over the number (Possible Board Positions) of possible board positions after n jumps, and the possibility of the same peg moved to make a further jump (No Further Jumps). Interesting to note is that the shortest way to fail the game is in six moves, and the solution (besides its rotations and reflections) is unique. An example of this is as follows: 4 → 16; 23 → 9; 14 → 16; 17 → 15; 19 → 17; 31 → 23. (In this notation, the pegs are numbered from left to right, starting with 0, and moving down each row and to the far left once each row is marked.)

NOTE: If one board position can be rotated and/or flipped into another board position, the board positions are counted as identical.

n	PBP	NFJ
1	1	0
2	2	0
3	8	0
4	39	0
5	171	0
6	719	1
7	2,757	0
8	9,751	0
9	31,312	0
10	89,927	1

n	PBP	NFJ
11	229,614	1
12	517,854	0
13	1,022,224	5
14	1,753,737	10
15	2,598,215	7
16	3,312,423	27
17	3,626,632	47
18	3,413,313	121
19	2,765,623	373
20	1,930,324	925

n	PBP	NFJ
21	1,160,977	1,972
22	600,372	3,346
23	265,865	4,356
24	100,565	4,256
25	32,250	3,054
26	8,688	1,715
27	1,917	665
28	348	182
29	50	39
30	7	6

n	PBP	NFJ
31	2	2

Since there can only be 31 jumps, modern computers can easily examine all game positions in a reasonable time.

The above sequence "PBP" has been entered as A112737 in OEIS. Note that the total number of reachable board positions (sum of the sequence) is 23,475,688, while the total number of possible board positions is 8,589,934,590 (33bit-1) (2^33), so only about 2.2% of all possible board positions can be reached starting with the center vacant.

It is also possible to generate all board positions. The results below have been obtained using the mCRL2 toolset (see the peg_solitaire example in the distribution).

n	PBP
1	1
2	4
3	12
4	60
5	296
6	1,338
7	5,648
8	21,842

n	PBP
9	77,559
10	249,690
11	717,788
12	1,834,379
13	4,138,302
14	8,171,208
15	14,020,166
16	20,773,236

n	PBP
17	26,482,824
18	28,994,876
19	27,286,330
20	22,106,348
21	15,425,572
22	9,274,496
23	4,792,664
24	2,120,101

n	PBP
25	800,152
26	255,544
27	68,236
28	14,727
29	2,529
30	334
31	32
32	5

In the results below, it has generated all the board positions it really reached starting with the center vacant and finishing in the central hole.

n	Real
1	1
2	4
3	12
4	60
5	292
6	1,292
7	5,012
8	16,628

n	Real
9	49,236
10	127,964
11	285,740
12	546,308
13	902,056
14	1,298,248
15	1,639,652
16	1,841,556

n	Real
17	1,841,556
18	1,639,652
19	1,298,248
20	902,056
21	546,308
22	285,740
23	127,964
24	49,236

n	Real
25	16,628
26	5,012
27	1,292
28	292
29	60
30	12
31	4
32	1

=== Solutions to the European game ===
There are 3 initial non-congruent positions that have solutions. These are:

1)

0123456
0
1
2
3
4
5
6
European solvable starting position 1

Possible solution: [2:2-0:2, 2:0-2:2, 1:4-1:2, 3:4-1:4, 3:2-3:4, 2:3-2:1, 5:3-3:3, 3:0-3:2, 5:1-3:1, 4:5-4:3, 5:5-5:3, 0:4-2:4, 2:1-4:1, 2:4-4:4, 5:2-5:4, 3:6-3:4, 1:1-1:3, 2:6-2:4, 0:3-2:3, 3:2-5:2, 3:4-3:2, 6:2-4:2, 3:2-5:2, 4:0-4:2, 4:3-4:1, 6:4-6:2, 6:2-4:2, 4:1-4:3, 4:3-4:5, 4:6-4:4, 5:4-3:4, 3:4-1:4, 1:5-1:3, 2:3-0:3, 0:2-0:4]

2)

0123456
0
1
2
3
4
5
6
European solvable starting position 2

Possible solution: [1:1-1:3, 3:2-1:2, 3:4-3:2, 1:4-3:4, 5:3-3:3, 4:1-4:3, 2:1-4:1, 2:6-2:4, 4:4-4:2, 3:4-1:4, 3:2-3:4, 5:1-3:1, 4:6-2:6, 3:0-3:2, 4:5-2:5, 0:2-2:2, 2:6-2:4, 6:4-4:4, 3:4-5:4, 2:3-2:1, 2:0-2:2, 1:4-3:4, 5:5-5:3, 6:3-4:3, 4:3-4:1, 6:2-4:2, 3:2-5:2, 4:0-4:2, 5:2-3:2, 3:2-1:2, 1:2-1:4, 0:4-2:4, 3:4-1:4, 1:5-1:3, 0:3-2:3]

3)

0123456
0
1
2
3
4
5
6
European solvable starting position 3

Possible solution: [2:1-2:3, 0:2-2:2, 4:1-2:1, 4:3-4:1, 2:3-4:3, 1:4-1:2, 2:1-2:3, 0:4-0:2, 4:4-4:2, 3:4-1:4, 6:3-4:3, 1:1-1:3, 4:6-4:4, 5:1-3:1, 2:6-2:4, 1:4-1:2, 0:2-2:2, 3:6-3:4, 4:3-4:1, 6:2-4:2, 2:3-2:1, 4:1-4:3, 5:5-5:3, 2:0-2:2, 2:2-4:2, 3:4-5:4, 4:3-4:1, 3:0-3:2, 6:4-4:4, 4:0-4:2, 3:2-5:2, 5:2-5:4, 5:4-3:4, 3:4-1:4, 1:5-1:3]

=== Board variants ===
Peg solitaire has been played on other size boards, although the two given above are the most popular. It has also been played on a triangular board, with jumps allowed in all 3 directions. As long as the variant has the proper "parity" and is large enough, it will probably be solvable. In 2025, YouTuber Michael Stevens laid out each of these variants on one board. He called it "Omnijump".

Peg solitaire game board shapes: (1) French (European) style, 37 holes, 17th century; (2) J. C. Wiegleb, 1779, Germany, 45 holes; (3) Asymmetrical 3-3-2-2 as described by George Bell, 20th century; (4) English style (standard), 33 holes; (5) Diamond, 41 holes; (6) Triangular, 15 holes. Grey = the hole for the survivor.

A common triangular variant has five pegs on a side. A solution where the final peg arrives at the initial empty hole is not possible for a hole in one of the three central positions. An empty corner-hole setup can be solved in ten moves, and an empty midside-hole setup in nine (Bell 2008):

Shortest solution to triangular variant
Start
11-13
14-12
4-13
1-4
3-8
10-3
7-2
12-14
15-13-6-1-4-13
Shortest solution to triangular variant

== Video game ==
On June 26, 1992, a video game based on peg solitaire was released for the Game Boy. Titled simply Solitaire, the game was developed by Hect. In North America, DTMC released the game as Lazlos' Leap.

Professor Layton and the Diabolical Box features six puzzles asking the player to solve the English peg solitaire board from different initial positions, the last one being the traditional configuration.

== In popular culture ==
The PC game Shivers, a horror-themed point and click puzzle game, features many puzzles/games for the player to complete. The puzzle dubbed "Chinese Checkers" is actually peg solitaire.

Cracker Barrel features the game at every table at their locations. The board featured is triangular with 15 total holes.

In Cowboy Bebop: The Movie, the main antagonist, Vincent Volaju, spends most of his free time playing peg solitaire. The vector for his planned Bioterrorism attack, a type of nanobot, is stored in peg solitaire marbles.
