= Peter Ružička =

Slovak scientist

- Peter Ružička
- Born: 9 August 1947; Bratislava, Czechoslovakia (now Slovakia)
- Died: 5 October 2003 (aged 56)
- Spouse: Marta
- Children: Kristina
- Scientific career
- Fields: Distributed computing, Computer networks, Computer science
- Institutions: Comenius University

Peter Ružička (9 August 1947 – 5 October 2003) was a Slovak computer scientist and mathematician who worked in the fields of distributed computing and computer networks. He was a professor at the Comenius University, Faculty of Mathematics, Physics and Informatics working in several research areas of theoretical computer science throughout his long career.

== Biography ==
Ruzicka graduated from Comenius University in Bratislava in 1970. In 1982 he received his Ph.D. degree in Mathematical and Computer Science from Czechoslovak Academy of Sciences in Prague. He was awarded his Doctorate (Dr. rer. nat.) in Mathematical Informatics and Theoretical Cybernetics from Comenius University in Bratislava in 1994.

His earlier works cover topics that include formal languages, unification, graph pebbling and others. Most of his research works since the early 1990s were in the areas of Communication Networks and Distributed Computing. These works include studies of complexity issues for various problems and models of Interval Routing, and for various problems and topics in distributed computing (like oriented and unoriented networks) and in interconnection networks.

Ruzicka was a regular participant in many conferences in this area, including DISC and SIROCCO; he was on the program committees of DISC 1998 and 2000 and SIROCCO 1999. He also enthusiastically organised DISC 1999 in Bratislava – held for the first time in a former East-European country, which proved to be a great success, highly appreciated by the Steering Committee and the whole audience. He participated and was very actively involved in other conferences, including ICALP, SOFSEM and MFCS. These activities included co-chairing MFCS 1994, chairing MFCS 1997 and chairing SOFSEM 2001, and being on the program committees of MFCS 2000 and SOFSEM 1997.

In 2003, he was appointed a professor in Informatics at the Comenius University in Bratislava.

Throughout his career, Ruzicka was a visiting professor at Northeastern University, Humboldt University of Berlin, Carleton University, University of Paderborn, RWTH Aachen University, Utrecht University, Technion University and many others.

== Awards and recognition ==
Committee for Academic and Scientific Literature and Computer Programmes of the Slovak Literary Fund granted to Peter Ruzicka in memoriam and collective, Award of acknowledgement for Academic and Scientific Literature for 2005 in the category of Natural and Technical Sciences for the book Dissemination of Information in Communication Networks.

== Personal life ==
Peter died of pancreatic cancer on 5 October 2003.

== Publications ==
Peter Ruzicka has authored and co-authored numerous publications and books. One of his last projects he worked on had been an EATCS Series book on Dissemination of Information in Communication Networks

== Other publications ==
- Prívara, Igor; Rovan, Branislav; Ruzička, Peter, eds. (1994-08-22). Mathematical Foundations of Computer Science 1994. 19th International Symposium, MFCS'94 Košice, Slovakia, August 22–26, 1994 Proceedings. LNCS. Vol. 841. Springer-Verlag. doi:10.1007/3-540-58338-6. ISBN 3-540-58338-6. ISSN 0302-9743.
- Prívara, Igor; Ružička, Peter, eds. (1997-08-13). Mathematical Foundations of Computer Science 1997. 22nd International Symposium, MFCS '97 Bratislava, Slovakia, August 25–29, 1997 Proceedings. LNCS. Vol. 1295. Springer-Verlag. doi:10.1007/BFb0029943. ISBN 3-540-63437-1. ISSN 0302-9743.
- KráĽovič, Rastislav; Rovan, Branislav; RuŽička, Peter; štefankovič, Daniel (1998-09-24). "Efficient deadlock-free multi-dimensional interval routing in interconnection networks". Distributed Computing. 12th International Symposium, DISC’98 Andros, Greece, September 24–26, 1998 Proceedings. LNCS. Vol. 1499. Springer-Verlag. pp. 273–287. doi:10.1007/BFb0056489. ISBN 3-540-65066-0. ISSN 0302-9743.
- Pacholski, Leszek; Ružička, Peter, eds. (2001-11-07). SOFSEM 2001: Theory and Practice of Informatics. 28th Conference on Current Trends in Theory and Practice of Informatics Piešt’any, Slovak Republic, November 24 – December 1, 2001 Proceedings. LNCS. Vol. 2234. Springer-Verlag. doi:10.1007/3-540-45627-9. ISBN 3-540-42912-3. ISSN 0302-9743.
