= Sandra Hutchins =

American computer scientist

Sandra Elaine Hutchins (born 1946) is an American computer scientist and communications engineer. Her area of expertise is speech recognition, that is, programming computers to process human voice.

Hutchins' main focus is writing programs that will allow computers to recognize and respond to spoken English, thereby removing the need for a keyboard.

== Education ==
Hutchins received her B.A. from the University of California, San Diego, in 1967. During her undergraduate studies, Hutchins majored in physics and minored in linguistics. In 1970, she received her Ph.D. in computer science, also from the University of California, San Diego.

== Career ==
Hutchins' current research is interdisciplinary, straddling the fields of linguistics, physics, and computer science. She has worked both at universities and with corporations and holds at least two patents. One patent is for computer speech recognition programs that work in loud environments, and one patent concerns digital compression of speech.

She began working at Purdue University as an assistant professor and electrical engineer in 1970 and continued with this position through 1972. Hutchins then became the senior staff engineer in communications with TRW Defense and Space Systems, where she worked until 1977. During part of her time with TRW, Hutchins also served as an instructor at Loyola Marymount University, teaching from 1973 to 1974. After leaving TRW, she assumed the role of engineering manager for Linkabit Corporations, from 1977 to 1979. She then became the software development manager for ITT Defense Communications Division, from 1981 to 1982. In 1983, Hutchins became Chief Technical Officer for Natural Speech Technologies, a job she held until 2001. While at Natural Speech Technologies, she supervised the development of many educational games, programs, software, and puzzles. Several of these games were displayed at the Smithsonian Institution in 1985, as part of an exhibit on American games.

In 1992, she was one of the winners of the Johns Hopkins National Search for Computing Applications to Assist People with Disabilities.

Hutchins worked as the manager of Bloomberg LP in New York, from 2001 to 2018.

== Memberships ==
Hutchins is a member of the Association for Computing Machinery. She is also a member of the Institute of Electrical and Electronics Engineers.

== See also ==
- International Phonetic Association website Prosodic Features in Automatic Language Identification Reflect Language Typology (paper written with Ann Thymé-Gobbel in 1999)
- Grant To Me website Abstract for the 'Rehabilitative Software for Head Trauma Victims' project
