= Damien Coyle =

British computer scientist

Damien Hugh Coyle (born 1980 in County Donegal, Ireland) is an Irish computer scientist and researcher, best known for his various publications on computational neuroscience, neuroimaging, neurotechnology, and brain-computer interface. He has served as Professor of Neurotechnology at the Ulster University. He was made a fellow of the Royal Academy of Engineering in 2013.

== Works ==
- Coyle, Damien (2016). Brain-computer interfaces : lab experiments to real-world applications. Amsterdam, Netherlands. ISBN 9780128092620. OCLC 1099565118.
