= List of Slovenian computer scientists =

This is a list of the best-known Slovenian computer scientists.

== B ==
- Vladimir Batagelj (1948–)
- Ivan Bratko (1946–)

== J ==
- Primož Jakopin

== L ==
- Ivo Lah (1896–1979)
- Jure Leskovec

== M ==
- Andrej Mrvar

== P ==
- Marko Petkovšek (1955–2023)
- Tomaž Pisanski (1949–)
- Bogdan Pogorelc

== T ==
- Denis Trček (1965–)

== V ==
- Jurij Vega (1754–1802)

== Z ==
- Egon Zakrajšek (1941–2002)
- Aleš Žiberna

== See also ==
- List of Slovenians
