= Lisa Anthony =

American computer scientist

- Occupation: Associate professor

Academic background
- Education: Carnegie Mellon University
- Thesis: Developing Handwriting-based Intelligent; Tutors to Enhance Mathematics Learning (2008)
- Doctoral advisor: Kenneth Koedinger, Jie Yang

Academic work
- Discipline: Computer scientist
- Sub-discipline: Human–computer interaction
- Website: https://lisa-anthony.com/

Lisa Anthony is an associate professor in the Department of Computer & Information Science & Engineering (CISE) at the University of Florida. She is also the director of the Intelligent Natural Interaction Technology Laboratory (INIT Lab). Her research interests revolve around developing natural user interfaces to allow for greater human-computer interaction, specifically for children as they develop their cognitive and physical abilities.

== Education ==
Lisa Anthony earned her B.S. and M.S. in computer science with official concentrations in artificial intelligence, human-computer Interaction, and software engineering at Drexel University. Her M.S. thesis involved using genetic programming to evolve board evaluation functions for the strategy board game Acquire. As a summer graduate intern, she worked on the Collaborative Exploratory Search project at the Fuji-Xerox Palo Alto Laboratory (FXPAL).

In 2008, she earned her Ph.D. from the Human Computer Interaction Institute in the School of Computer Science at Carnegie Mellon University in 2008. Her Ph.D. thesis focused on developing handwriting-based systems for algebra equation-solving.

== Career ==
Anthony was also a Post-Doctoral Research Associate, then a Research Assistant Professor in the Department of Information Systems at the University of Maryland, Baltimore County. She worked on advanced user interface technologies as a senior member of the engineering staff at the User-Centered Interfaces Group at Lockheed Martin Advanced Technology Laboratories. She is an currently an associate professor in the Department of Computer & Information Science & Engineering at University of Florida.

== Awards and honors ==
- National Science Foundation CAREER Award, 2016-2020
- HWCOE Undergraduate Faculty Adviser/Mentor of the Year, 2017-2018
- Special Recognition for Exceptional Reviewing, ACM Conference on Designing Interactive Systems (DIS), 2014
- Best of 2013, ACM Computing Reviews, 2013
- Best Paper Award, ACM SIGCHI Conference on Human Factors in Computing Systems (CHI), 2013
- Best Paper Award, ACM International Conference on Multimodal Interaction (ICMI), 2012

== Selected publications ==
Journal Articles

- Anthony, Lisa; Regli, William C.; John, Jon E.; Lombeyda, Santiago V. (2001). "An Approach to Capturing Structure, Behavior, and Function of Artifacts in Computer-Aided Design". Journal of Computing and Information Science in Engineering. 1 (2): 186–192. doi:10.1115/1.1385826.
- Anthony, Lisa; Wobbrock, Jacob O. (2010). "A lightweight multistroke recognizer for user interface prototypes". Proceedings of Graphics Interface 2010: Ottawa, Ontario, Canada, 31 May-2 June 2010. Mould, David; Noël, Sylvie (program chairs). Toronto: Canadian Information Processing Society. ISBN 978-1-56881-712-5. OCLC 635455649.
- Anthony, Lisa; Yang, Jie; Koedinger, Kenneth R. (2012). "A paradigm for handwriting-based intelligent tutors". International Journal of Human-Computer Studies. 70 (11): 866–887. doi:10.1016/j.ijhcs.2012.04.003. S2CID 7457167.
- Vatavu, Radu-Daniel; Anthony, Lisa; Brown, Quincy (2015). "Child or Adult? Inferring Smartphone Users' Age Group from Touch Measurements Alone". Human-Computer Interaction – INTERACT 2015 (PDF). Lecture Notes in Computer Science. Vol. 9299. pp. 1–9. doi:10.1007/978-3-319-22723-8_1. ISBN 978-3-319-22722-1. S2CID 4675792.

Book Chapters

- Anthony, L., Sharma, K., Stibler, K., Regli, S.H., Tremoulet, P. D., Gilbertson, D.G., and Gerhardt, R.T. 2010. Enabling Pre-Hospital Documentation via Spoken Language Understanding on the Modern Battlefield. In Advances in Human Factors and Ergonomics in Healthcare (Proceedings of the International Conference on Applied Human Factors & Ergonomics - AHFE’2010), ed. V.G. Duffy, CRC Press, p. 642-651
