= Andrey Yershov =

Soviet computer scientist

- Born: Andrey Petrovich Yershov; 19 April 1931; Moscow, RSFSR
- Died: 8 December 1988 (aged 57); Moscow
- Citizenship: Soviet Union
- Education: Moscow State University
- Known for: ALPHA, Rapira languages AIST-0 Soviet first time-sharing system RUBIN electronic publishing system MRAMOR multiprocessing workstation IFIP WG 2.1 member Aesthetics and the Human Factor in Programming
- Scientific career
- Fields: Computer science
- Academic advisors: Alexey Lyapunov

Andrey Petrovich Yershov (Russian: Андре́й Петро́вич Ершо́в; 19 April 1931 – 8 December 1988) was a Soviet computer scientist, notable as a pioneer in systems programming and programming language research.

Donald Knuth considers him to have independently co-discovered the idea of hashing with linear probing. He also created one of the first algorithms for compiling arithmetic expressions.

He was responsible for the languages ALPHA and Rapira, the first Soviet time-sharing system AIST-0, the electronic publishing system RUBIN, and a multiprocessing workstation MRAMOR. He also was the initiator of developing the Computer Bank of the Russian Language (Машинный Фонд Русского Языка), the Soviet project for creating a large representative Russian corpus, a project in the 1980s comparable to the Bank of English and British National Corpus. The Russian National Corpus created by the Russian Academy of Sciences in the 2000s is a successor of Yershov's project.

From 1959, he worked at the Siberian Division of the Academy of Sciences of the Soviet Union, and helped found both the Novosibirsk Computer Center and the Siberian School of Computer Science.

He received the Academician A. N. Krylov Prize from the Academy of Sciences, the first programmer to be so recognized. In 1974, he was made a Distinguished Fellow of the British Computer Society.

He was involved with developing international standards in programming and informatics, as a member of the International Federation for Information Processing (IFIP) IFIP Working Group 2.1 on Algorithmic Languages and Calculi, which specified, maintains, and supports the languages ALGOL 60 and ALGOL 68. In 1981, he received the IFIP's Silver Core Award.

To the computer science community, he is mostly known for his speech Aesthetics and the Human Factor in Programming presented at the dinner at the AFIPS Spring Joint Computer Conference in 1972 and, due to its importance, republished as an article by the Communications of the ACM.

== See also ==
- List of Russian IT developers
- List of computer scientists
- List of programmers

== Books ==
- Programming Programme for the BESM Computer, Pergamon Press, London, 1959. Translated from the Russian original: Программирующая программа для быстродействующей электронной счетной машины, 1958.
