= Rapira =

Procedural programming language

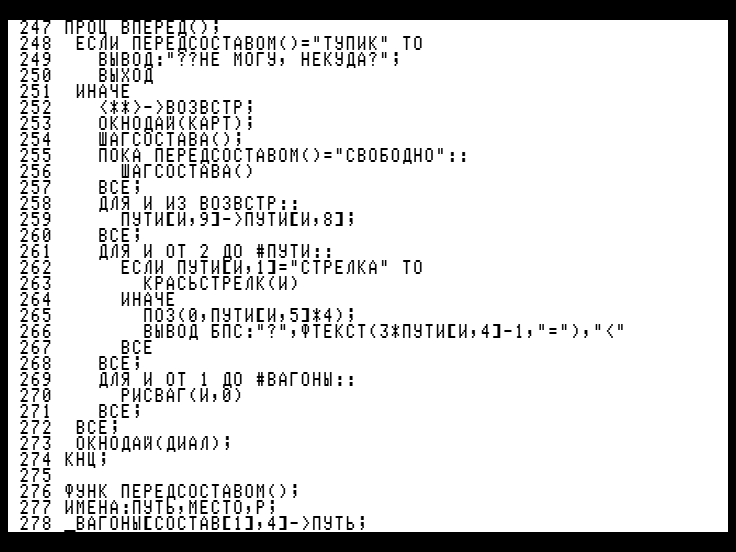
- Part of a Rapira program.
- Paradigms: procedural, structured
- Designed by: Andrey Ershov
- First appeared: 1982; 44 years ago
- Typing discipline: dynamic
- Scope: Lexical (static)
- Platform: Agat, PDP-11 (clones: Electronika, DVK series); Intel 8080, Zilog Z80

Influenced by
- ALGOL, POP-2, SETL

Rapira (Russian: Рапира, rapier) is an educational procedural programming language developed in the Soviet Union. It was implemented on the Agat computer, PDP-11 clones (Electronika, DVK, BK series), and Intel 8080 and Zilog Z80 clones (Korvet). It is interpreted with a dynamic type system and high level constructions. The language originally had a Russian-based set of reserved words (keywords), but English and Romanian were added later. It was considered more elegant and easier to use than Pascal implementations of the time.

Rapira was used to teach computer programming in Soviet schools. The integrated development environment included a text editor and a debugger.

Sample program:

ПРОЦ СТАРТ()
    ВЫВОД: 'Привет, мир!!!'
КОН ПРОЦ

The same, but using the English lexics [sic, from the article referenced below]:

proc start()
     output: 'Hello, world!!!';
end proc

Rapira's ideology was based on languages such as POP-2 and SETL, with strong influences from ALGOL.

Consequently, for example, Rapira implements a very strong and flexible data structure, named a tuple. In Rapira, these are heterogeneous lists with allowed operations such as indexing, joining, length count, getting of sublist, easy comparison, etc.
