= Tetiana Podchasova =

Ukrainian economist-computer scientist (born 1940)

Tetiana Pavlovna Podchasova (born 1940) is a Ukrainian economist-cyberneticist, computer scientist and professor. She earned her Doctor of Technical Sciences in 1986. In 1970, she was awarded the State Prize of the Ukrainian SSR in science and technology.

== Biography ==
Podchasova was born 30 May 1940 in Kyiv to Olena Verenych and Pavel Podchasov, who was a scientist–mechanic and major general; in 1947–1953 headed the Kyiv Institute of Civil Air Fleet.

=== Education ===
In 1962, Podchasova graduated from the Faculty of Mechanics and Mathematics of Taras Shevchenko Kyiv State University (KSU), majoring as Mathematician-Computer Scientist. Since then, she has been an engineer, senior engineer, senior scientific specialist and head of research at the Institute of Cybernetics of the National Academy of Sciences of Ukraine.

In 1969, she received the degree of Candidate of Physical and Mathematical Sciences, defending her dissertation about Methods of Calendar Planning in Automated Systems. In 1986, she defended her thesis for the degree of Doctor of Technical Sciences. From 1970 to 1974, she taught at Taras Shevchenko National University of Kyiv.

=== Career ===
From 1997 to 2001, Podchasova headed the department of automated enterprise management systems of the newly established International Scientific and Educational Center for Information Technologies and Systems of the National Academy of Sciences of Ukraine and the Ministry of Education and Science of Ukraine.

Since 1998, she has been a professor at the Department of Software Engineering and Information Systems at the Kyiv National University of Trade and Economics (KNUTE). She has taught the following subjects: Informatics and Computer Engineering, Information Technologies and Systems, Management Decision Support Systems, Operations Research, Modeling of Management and Marketing in Information Systems.

Her teaching experience spans more than 40 years. In addition to KSU and KNUTE, she taught at Kyiv University of Civil Engineering and Architecture, Cherkasy State Technological University and Far Eastern Federal University in Vladivostok, Russia.

In 2015, she retired from her university positions, but she continues to participate in events dedicated to cybernetics and its creators, in particular her teacher, the computer scientist Viktor Glushkov, who established the Institute of Cybernetics of the National Academy of Science of Ukraine and became its first director In 1962.

=== Awards ===
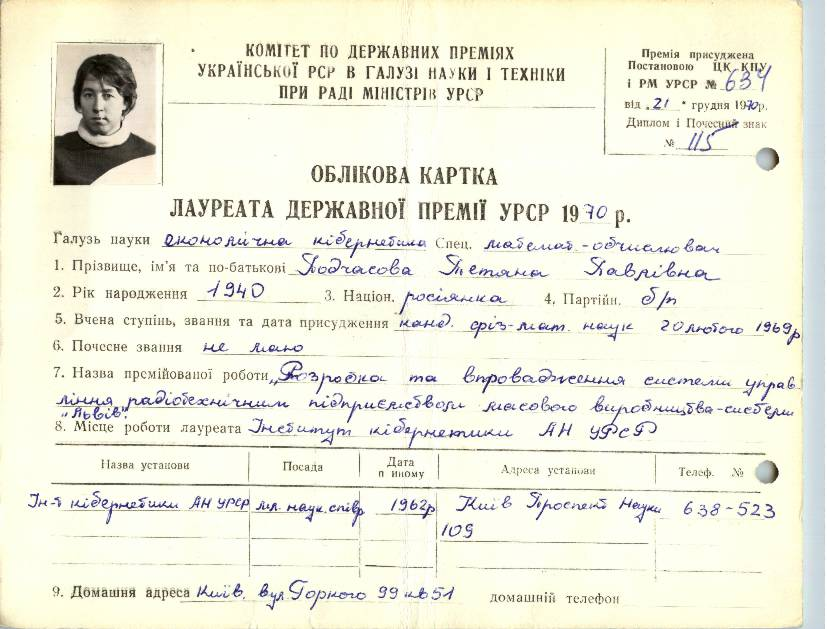
Podchasova's registration card for the State Prize of the Ukraine SSR in 1970.

In the mid-1960s, Podchasova participated in the development and implementation of the functional part of the automated management system of the Lviv enterprise. For that work, together with her colleagues, she was awarded the State Prize of the Ukrainian SSR in the field of science and technology.

In 2005, her family received the Certificate of Honor from the Ministry of Light and Science of Ukraine.
