= Shashi Shekhar (scientist) =

Indian-American computer scientist

Shashi Shekhar is a leading scholar of spatial computing, spatial data science, and Geographic Information Systems (GIS). Contributions include scalable roadmap storage methods and algorithms for eco-routing, evacuation route planning, and spatial pattern (e.g., colocation) mining, along with an Encyclopedia of GIS, a Spatial Databases textbook, and a spatial computing book for professionals. Currently, he is serving as a McKnight Distinguished University Professor, a Distinguished University Teaching Professor, ADC Chair and an Associate Director of the College of Science and Engineering Data Science Initiative at the University of Minnesota.

== Education ==
Shekhar received a B.Tech. in Computer Science from the IIT Kanpur in 1985. He then earned a M.S. in Computer Science (1987), a M.S. in Business Administration (1989) and a Ph.D. in Computer Science (1989) from the University of California, Berkeley. Earlier, he attended the Netarhat Awasiya Vidyalaya.

== Research ==
Shekhar is a scholar of spatial computing, spatial data science (e.g., spatial data mining, spatial database) and Geographic Information Systems (GIS). A major goal of his research is to understand the structure of big spatial computations underlying societal grand challenges. For example, his early research developed roadmap storage and scalable routing methods, which have revolutionized outdoor navigation paving way for navigation devices and apps, and received the IEEE Computer Society's Technical Achievement Award^{[15]} which is presented for outstanding and innovative contributions to the fields of computer and information science and engineering or computer technology, usually within the past 10, and not more than 15 years.

In the mid-2000s, his group developed capacity constrained route planners to significantly speed up evacuation route planning to move vulnerable population to safety in the event of natural or man-made disasters. It was invited for presentation in a Congressional breakfast on homeland security and used for homeland security preparations in Minneapolis/St. Paul metropolitan area, where it showed that walking able-bodied the first mile often speeded up evacuation significantly. Besides evacuation routes and schedules, it also identified difficult-to-evacuate areas needing enrichment of transportation networks. The research received the Research Partnership Award (2006) for significant findings that have influenced transportation practice and/or policy. Recently, it was used for shelter allocation in Hajj (Mecca).

In the big data era, Shekhar investigated eco-routing to investigate the potential of spatial big data to recommend eco-routes to reduce emissions and energy use. Recently, it also received the Research Partnership Award (2021) for significant findings influencing Transportation practice and/or policy.

Moreover, he pioneered the research area of spatial data mining via pattern families (e.g., colocation, linear hotspots, significant DBSCAN, Spatial Variability Aware Neural Networks), keynotes, surveys, and community building.

His current research includes exploring spatial data mining methods for climate-smart agriculture and forestry, polar sciences, trajectory mining, etc.

== Service ==
Shekhar is currently serving as a co-editor in chief of Geo-Informatica journal and general co-chair of the 2023 SIAM International Conference on Data Mining. Earlier, he served on many National Academies' committees, including Geo-targeted Disaster Alerts and Warning, From Maps to Models, Future Workforce for GEOINT, Mapping Sciences, and Priorities for GEOINT Research.

Furthermore, he served as the President of the University Consortium for GIS (UCGIS) leading a call for action to include spatial perspective in data science courses and curricula. Moreover, he served on the Computing Research Association (CRA) board, presented at the 2015 Congressional Reception on Deconstructing Precision Agriculture, and co-chaired the CRA Conference at Snowbird (2022).

Further, he co-organized a NSF Workshop to Identify Interdisciplinary Data Science Approaches and Challenges to Enhance Understanding of Interactions of Food Systems with Energy and Water Systems, and the CCC Workshop on From GPS and Virtual Globes to Spatial Computing. Also, he served on the CRA Computing Community Consortium Council coordinating the initiative to organize Blue Sky Ideas track at conferences to encourage out of box thinking.

In addition, he has served as either a program or a general co-chair for the ACM SIGSPATIAL International Conference on Advances in GIS (2021, 2022), International Symposium on Spatial and Temporal Databases (2011), International Conference on Geographic Information Science (2012), etc.

== Awards and honours ==
For contributions to geographic information systems (GIS), spatial databases and spatial data mining, Shekhar was elected an IEEE Fellow (2003) as well as an American Association for the Advancement of Science (AAAS) Fellow and received the IEEE Computer Society Edward J. McCluskey Technical Achievement Award (2006) as well as the UCGIS Education Award. He was also named a key difference-maker for the field of GIS by a popular GIS textbook.

Within the University of Minnesota, he received the Distinguished McKnight University Professorship (2005), a University Distinguished Teaching Professorship (2014) and a DSI/ADC Chair. He also received the Research Partnership Award (2006, 2021) from University of Minnesota Center for Transportation Studies and was elected a Fellow of the Institute on Environment (2011).
