= Kelsey Hightower =

American software engineer, developer advocate, and speaker (born 1981)

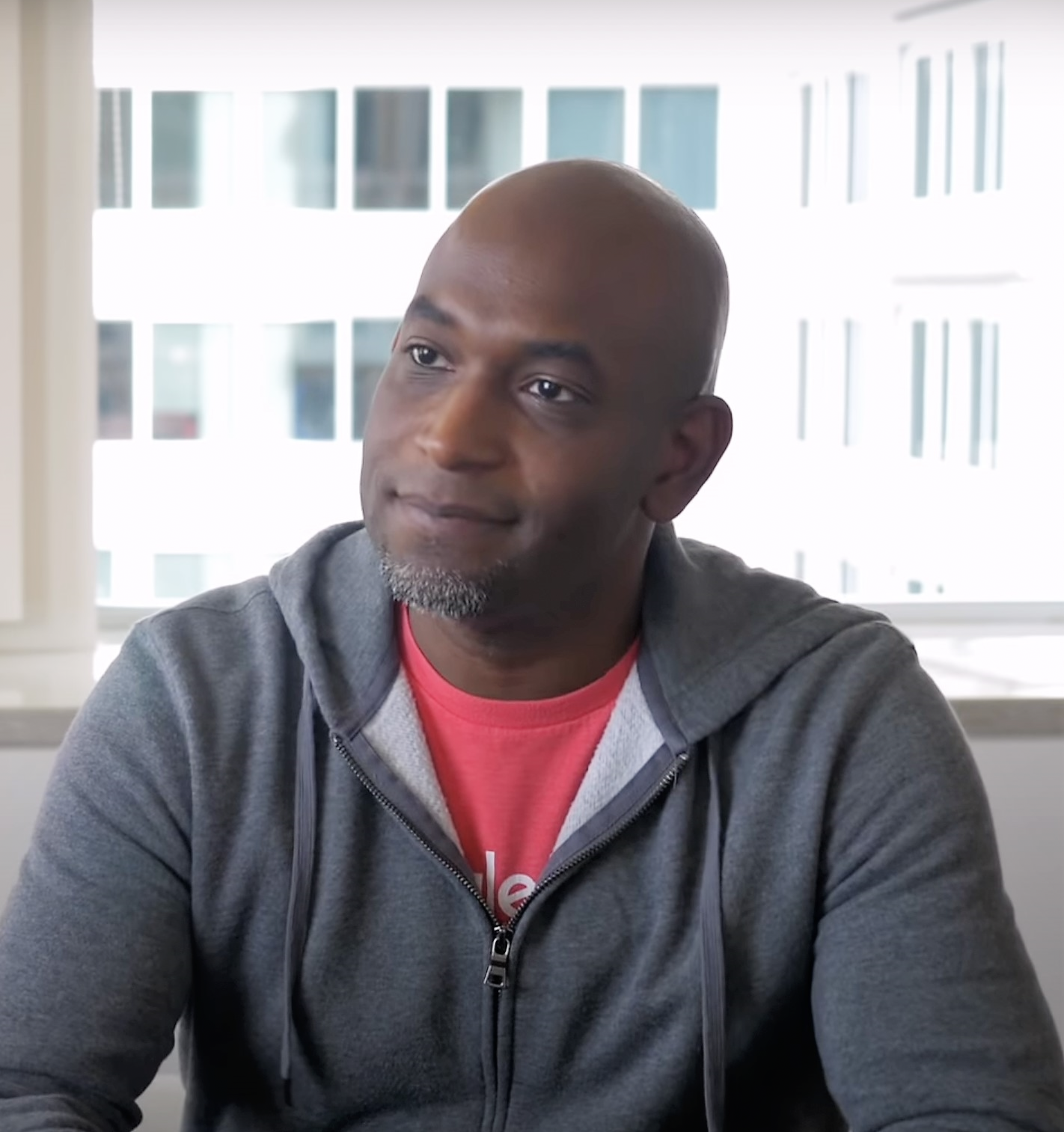
- Kelsey Hightower in 2019
- Born: February 27, 1981 (age 45)
- Education: Clayton State University speaker
- Occupations: Software engineer, developer advocate, and
- Employer: Google

Kelsey Hightower (born February 27, 1981) is an American software engineer, developer advocate, and speaker known for his work with Kubernetes, open-source software, and cloud computing.

== Early life and education ==
Hightower grew up in Long Beach, California, then moved to Atlanta, Georgia with his mother as he was beginning high school. After high school he enrolled at Clayton State University, but found the technology courses to be lacking and didn't continue. He then began courses to earn his CompTIA A+ information technology (IT) certification.

== Career ==
When Hightower was 19 years old, after earning his CompTIA A+ certification, he got a job with BellSouth installing DSL service. He continued to work with BellSouth for several years, then began his own IT consultancy. He hired several others, and ultimately opened a store in Jonesboro, Georgia. Also in his early career, Hightower briefly worked as a technician for Google, then at Total Systems (now called TSYS).

Hightower began to give talks at Python meetups in Atlanta, where he was noticed by James Turnbull for how he and his colleagues were using Puppet, Python, and their own code to manage and automate deploys. In 2013, Puppet, Inc. invited Hightower to speak at their headquarters for a developer event, and then offered Hightower a job as a software engineer. Hightower began working for Puppet remotely from Atlanta, then moved to Portland, Oregon to work from their headquarters. Meanwhile, Hightower learned about technologies including Go and Docker containers, which he believed would be transformative to software infrastructure.

Hightower then briefly worked at a small Portland startup called Monsoon Commerce, at which he wrote confd, his first open-source project. He joined CoreOS as an early team member towards the beginning of 2014, and began to contribute significantly to the Kubernetes project.

Since November 2015, Hightower has worked for Google as an engineer and developer advocate in their cloud computing division. As of October 2022, Hightower is a distinguished engineer, level 9 (L9) as an individual contributor, with Google Cloud.

On June 26, 2023, Hightower announced his retirement from Google on Twitter, stating, among other things that "if everything goes to plan, then this is the last job [he'll] ever have."

== Open source and developer advocacy ==
In 2014, while working for CoreOS, Hightower became an active evangelist of Kubernetes, and began to speak widely on the topic at developer conferences. He has since become one of the most well-known speakers on Kubernetes, and has also spoken on other topics, including serverless computing. In 2015, he co-founded the Kubernetes-focused conference KubeCon, which he then turned over to be managed by the Cloud Native Computing Foundation in subsequent years.

In 2017, he co-wrote a book with Kubernetes co-founders Joe Beda and Brendan Burns, titled Kubernetes Up and Running.

In 2019, Hightower was co-chair of the O'Reilly Open Source Convention and on the governing board of the Cloud Native Computing Foundation.

== Publications ==
- Hightower, Kelsey; Burns, Brendan; Beda, Joe (2017). Kubernetes: Up and Running. O'Reilly. ISBN 9781491935675.

== See also ==
- Ian Coldwater
- Brad Fitzpatrick
