= Derek McAuley =

British academic

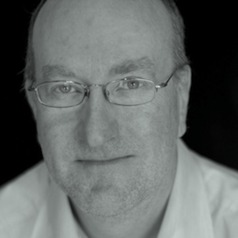
- Education: University of Cambridge
- Awards: FREng
- Scientific career
- Workplaces: University of Glasgow; University of Nottingham
- Thesis: Protocol Design for High Speed Networks (1989)
- Doctoral advisor: Ian Leslie
- Website: www.cs.nott.ac.uk/~drm/

Derek Robert McAuley is a British academic who is Professor of Digital Economy in the School of Computer Science at the University of Nottingham and director of Horizon Digital Economy Research, an interdisciplinary research institute funded through the RCUK Digital Economy programme. He acted as a Specialist Advisor to the House of Lords European Union Committee into online platforms, and Chief Innovation Officer during the founding of the Digital Catapult. He is a Fellow of the British Computer Society and member of the UKCRC, a computing research expert panel of the Institution of Engineering and Technology and BCS.

== Academic career ==
McAuley undertook his PhD in computer science at the Cambridge University Computer Laboratory for which his thesis topic was Protocol Design for High Speed Networks. From 1990 to 1995 McAuley was a lecturer at the Computer Laboratory at the University of Cambridge. In 1995 he became a professor in computer science at the University of Glasgow, a position which he held until 1997. In 2009 he moved to the University of Nottingham as Professor of Digital Economy and director of the Horizon Digital Economy Research Hub.

== Career in industry ==
McAuley returned to Cambridge in July 1997, as co-founder and deputy director of the Cambridge Microsoft Research facility. He then founded Intel Research Cambridge in 2002 and held the position of director until 2005 before undertaking the role as staff architect at Intel's Systems Technology Lab in Oregon. In August 2006, McAuley joined the start-up company XenSource as a senior director prior to its acquisition by Citrix. In 2007 he then moved to Netronome as chief technology officer, a position he held until December 2008.

== Research ==
McAuley's current research expertise is in ubiquitous computing, computer architecture, networking, distributed systems and operating systems. He is also interested in the interdisciplinary issues of ethics, identity, privacy, information policy, legislation and economics within a digital society and has been outspoken on the risks of naive adoption of technology. A full list of recent publications is published on the University of Nottingham website.
