= Gillian Lovegrove =

British computer scientist and academic

- Born: Gillian Lesley Lowther; 28 October 1942 (age 84); Yorkshire
- Died: May 28, 2026; Portsmouth, UK
- Education: Newnham College, Cambridge, Cambridge University
- Occupations: computer scientist, academic
- Employer(s): Portsmouth Polytechnic, Southampton University, University of Staffordshire, Northumbria University, British Computer Society

Gillian Lovegrove (born 1942) is a retired computer scientist and academic. She was Dean of the School of Informatics at Northumbria University, president of the Conference of Professors and Heads of Computing and was Higher Education consultant to the British Computer Society and manager of its Education and Training Forum. She is known for her interest in gender imbalance in computer education and employment, and her public discussion of possible solutions to a shortage of information technology graduates in the UK.

== Early life and education ==
Gillian Lesley Lowther, now Gillian Lovegrove, was born in Yorkshire on 28 October 1942 and grew up in the Hull area. She went to Malet Lambert School and then to Newnham College, Cambridge to study mathematics. After her first degree in 1964, she did a Masters-equivalent Diploma at Cambridge University in Numerical Analysis and Automatic Computing.

== Career ==
She was a lecturer in mathematics at Portsmouth Polytechnic from 1965 to 1968 and then went as a research fellow to Southampton University, where she started maths lecturing in 1969. Her career had to be part-time as she combined it with motherhood responsibilities for a few years in the 1970s. In 1974 she got her PhD with a dissertation on modular operating systems, after studying under David Barron, and in 1980 she began full-time lecturing in computer studies at Southampton. Her next research interest was object-oriented computing.

She co-wrote two papers about girls and computer education: Where Are All the Girls? (1987) and Where Are the Girls Now? (1991) with Wendy Hall, a colleague at Southampton. Lovegrove also organised "Women into Computing" conferences in the late 1980s where one of the themes that emerged was "dismay at the low number of women taking computing courses or following computing careers". In 1992 she went to the University of Staffordshire's School of Computing where she was associate dean and head of information systems. She was also in the "IT EQUATE" team exploring ways of encouraging more girls at school to consider IT as an area of study and as a future career. In 1995 a reviewer said her chapter, Women in Computing, in Professional Awareness in Software Engineering "grapples with the very difficult policy issues in the areas of legislation, institutional culture, and positive action".

She was concerned not only about a shortage of women in computing but also more generally about a shortage of information technology graduates in the UK and gave evidence on this subject to the Parliamentary Information Technology Committee in 2001. She suggested ways for universities to help create "a culture which does not exclude women" from computing. She continued making similar points about under-representation of women and an inadequate supply of IT graduates at conferences and elsewhere. The Times Higher Education Supplement said her field had become "the image of computing and what more computing departments can do for the UK economy". At a "Build Britain's Brainpower" conference in 2002 she proposed "joint teaching schemes between employers and universities", even though she felt teaching staff were already over-stretched after a period of rapid expansion in student numbers.

She was head-hunted by Northumbria University in 1999 to be Head of the School of Informatics, which grew under her leadership. She has also been chair of the Council of Professors and Heads of Computing (CPHC) and chaired the CPHC Information Strategy Group. She was manager of the British Computer Society (BCS) Education and Training Forum, and a Higher Education consultant for the BCS.
