= Jie Yang =

Computer engineer

Jie Yang is a computer engineer at the National Science Foundation in Arlington, Virginia. He was named a Fellow of the Institute of Electrical and Electronics Engineers (IEEE) in 2013 for his contributions to multimodal human–computer interaction.
