= Ian Coldwater =

American computer security specialist

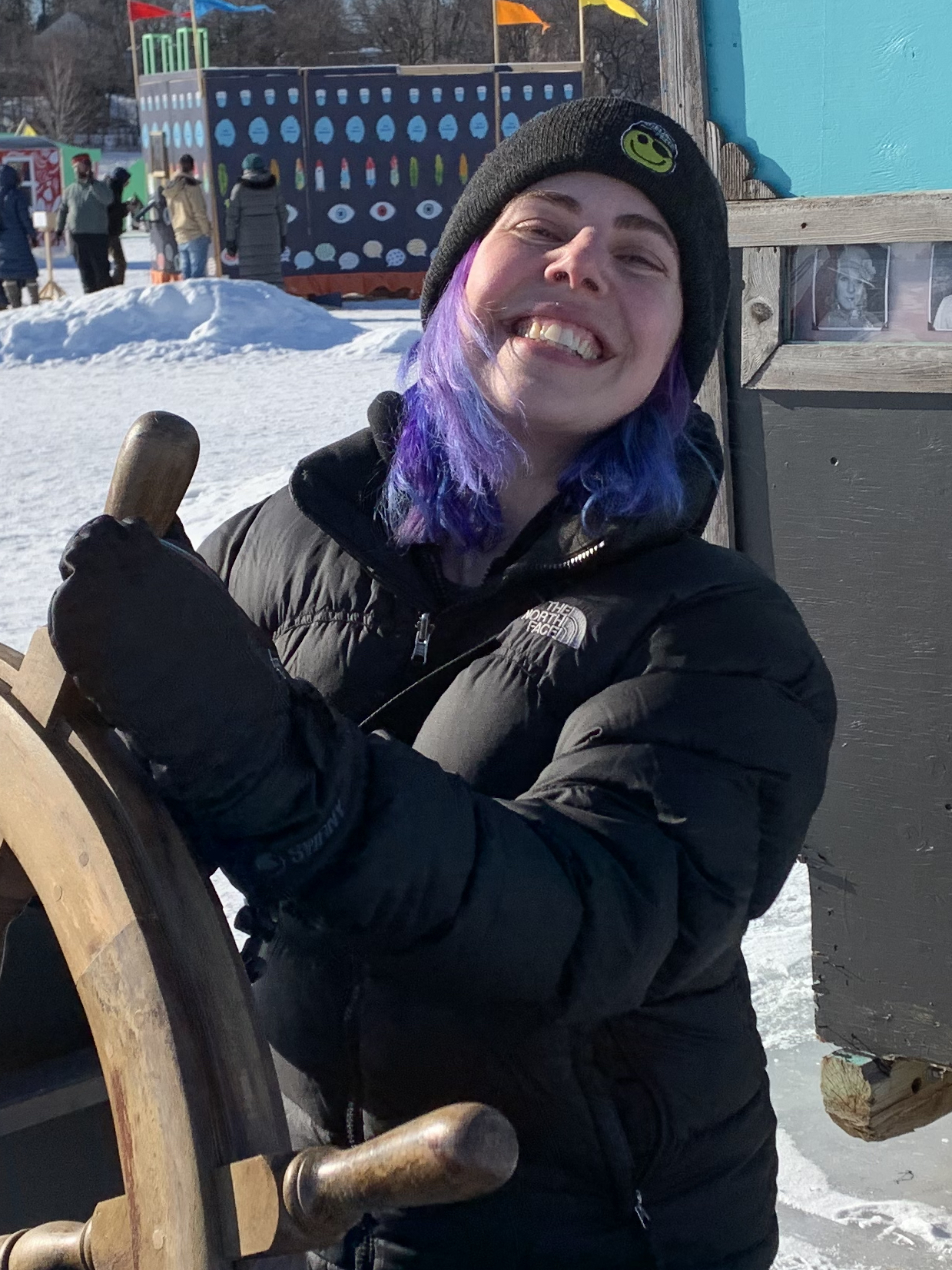
- Coldwater in 2020
- Occupations: Computer security specialist and speaker
- Employer: Docker, Inc.
- Organization(s): Kubernetes SIG Security, Open Source Security Foundation

Ian Coldwater is an American computer security specialist, hacker, and public speaker specializing in Kubernetes and cloud native security. They are a Senior Principal Security Architect at Docker, Inc., and co-chair the Kubernetes special interest group Kubernetes SIG Security.

== Career ==
Coldwater started working in tech in their thirties, starting in DevOps before focusing on security. They specialized in hacking and hardening Kubernetes containers, working as an independent penetration tester before joining Heroku as a lead platform security engineer. From 2020 to 2023, they worked as a security architect at Twilio. As of April 2, 2024, they work as a Senior Principal Security Architect at Docker, Inc.

Along with Tabitha Sable, they co-chair the Kubernetes special interest group, Kubernetes SIG Security. They are also on the governing board of the Open Source Security Foundation.

Coldwater has spoken at conferences including DEF CON, Black Hat, KubeCon and CloudNativeCon, RSA Conference, Velocity, and devopsdays. In 2020, they received the Top Ambassador award from the Cloud Native Computing Foundation for spreading interest in the area.

Hacking Kubernetes, published by O'Reilly Media, credits Coldwater and Duffie Cooley for co-developing the "canonical offensive Kubernetes one-liner". In 2020, Coldwater and Brad Geesaman presented a talk at RSA 2020 titled "Advanced Persistence Threats – The Future of Kubernetes Attacks", in which they demonstrated bypassing Kubernetes audit logs and other attacks. In 2021, Coldwater, with expertise from Chad Rikansrud, became the first person in history to escape a container on a mainframe.

== Personal life ==
Coldwater lives in Minneapolis, Minnesota. Coldwater is non-binary, and uses they/them pronouns.

== See also ==
- Kelsey Hightower
