= Oleg A. Mukhanov =

- Born: December 1959 (age 66)
- Known for: Superconducting electronics, quantum computing

Oleg A. Mukhanov is a Russian electrical engineer. He is an IEEE fellow who has focused on superconductivity. He is the co-inventor of SFQ digital technology. He resides in the United States.

== Early life and education ==
Mukhanov earned his bachelor’s degree at the National Research Nuclear University/Moscow Engineering Physics Institute, and his M.S. in electrical engineering with honors there in 1983. He earned his Ph.D. in physics from Moscow State University in 1988.

== Career ==
Mukhanov joined HYPRES as Chief Technical Officer in 1991 to initiate the development of Rapid Single Flux Quantum (RSFQ) superconductor circuit technology. He is the Chief Technical Officer, co-CEO and co-Founder of Seeqc.

== Recognition ==
- IEEE Fellow (2012) for leadership in research and development of superconducting digital electronics.
- IEEE Award for Continuing and Significant Contributions in the Field of Small Scale Applied Superconductivity in 2015.
- IEEE Council on Superconductivity (CSC) Outstanding Service Recognition for service as an editor of Special Issues of IEEE Transactions on Applied Superconductivity.
