= Rohini Kesavan Srihari =

American computer scientist

- Born: Mysore, Karnataka
- Education: University of Waterloo; University at Buffalo
- Known for: Founder of Janya Inc, Cymfony Inc and Cymfony Net Private Limited
- Scientific career
- Fields: Computational Linguistics; Information extraction Information retrieval

Rohini Kesavan Srihari is an American computer scientist and entrepreneur. She is the founder and CEO of Content Savvy Inc., a high-technology company in Western New York. Prior to this she founded Cymfony Inc., which specializes in brand analytics. She also founded Cymfony Net Private Limited in Bangalore, India. She also holds a position as Professor in the Department of Computer Science and Engineering of the University at Buffalo, Buffalo, New York, USA.

== Early life and education ==
Rohini Srihari received her early education in Lansing, Michigan, Kanpur India and Waterloo, Ontario. She received an undergraduate degree in Computer Science from the University of Waterloo, Ontario, Canada and the M.S. and Ph.D. degrees in Computer Science from the University at Buffalo, The State University of New York.

== Career ==
After receiving her Ph.D., Rohini Srihari joined the University at Buffalo as a research scientist funded by DARPA and NSF. She then became a professor in the Department of Computer Science and Engineering supervising 10 graduated Ph.D. students. She is an author of over 125 papers in Computer Science with a Google Scholar h-index of 30.

Rohini Srihari founded Cymfony Inc. in Williamsville, NY in 1999, Janya Inc. located in Amherst, NY and Washington DC in 2005, and Content Savvy Inc. in Amherst, NY in 2012.

Cymfony was among the first companies to apply information extraction technology to monitor the performance of brands by automatically analyzing press releases, media reports and blogs. This field has since come to be known as brand analytics. Janya Inc. was founded for work with the federal government.

Rohini Srihari was named to the Women of Accomplishment Legacy Project that identified "outstanding women of the 20th and 21st century who have touched Western New York with their genius, dedication and humanity and left a lasting legacy for the generations to come."
