= D. Richard Kuhn =

American cybersecurity and software testing expert

D. Richard Kuhn is an American computer scientist known for his research on role-based access control. Kuhn was elected as an IEEE Fellow in 2018, and as a Fellow of the American Association for the Advancement of Science in 2025.
