= Kit Cosper =

Red Hat employee

James Kitchen ‘Kit’ Cosper (born October 21, 1967, Wilmington, NC) was the sixth employee at Red Hat and one of the founders of Linux Hardware Solutions (LHS) as well as a founding director of Linux International.

After LHS was acquired by VA Linux Cosper became Director of Miscellaneous at VA and eventually managed their open source advocacy group, consisting of Chris DiBona, Joseph Arruda and John Mark Walker.

During the Dot Com implosion of 2001 Cosper left VA and went on to serve as Executive Technical Advisor and interim CTO at Telkonet, a powerline networking startup in Germantown, Maryland.

Cosper now serves as CEO of Voxiferi, LLC alongside former colleagues Richard Morrell, Steve Westmoreland, and John Mark Walker.

He was married on May 5, 1990, in Wilmington, NC to Lourie Cosper née Keifer and has three children: William (March 1985), Keifer (April 1993) and Elizabeth (Jan. 1996).

His first grandchild Hulet James Cosper, a namesake, was born in Jan. 2019 in Elmer, NJ to his oldest son William and his wife Elizabeth Cosper née Atwill. His second grandchild, Maverick Vaughn Kane, was born in Feb. 2026 to his daughter Elizabeth Kane née Cosper and her husband, Christopher.
