= Olaf Storaasli =

American computer scientist

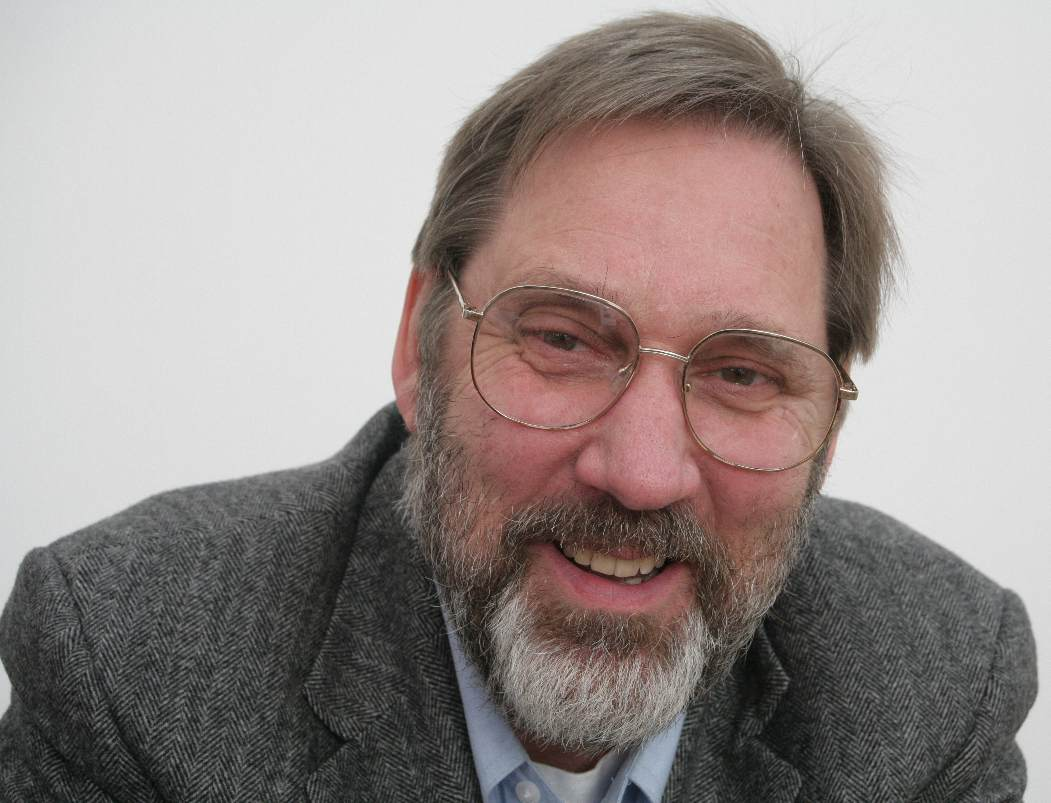
- Born: May 15, 1943 (age 83); Philadelphia, Pennsylvania
- Occupations: Computational Science & Engineering

Olaf O. Storaasli is a scientist & engineer who worked at NASA), Oak Ridge National Laboratory), Centrus Energy, & Synective Labs. At NASA, he led a hardware, software & applications teams to successfully develop one of NASA's first parallel computers, the finite element machine, & developed rapid matrix equation algorithms tailored for high-performance computers to harness FPGA & GPU accelerators to solve science & engineering applications. He was a graduate advisor & instructor at the University of Tennessee, George Washington University & Christopher Newport University.

== Education ==
Storaasli received a B.A. in physics, mathematics, & French at Concordia College (1964). He went on to earn an M.A. in mathematics at University of South Dakota (1966) and a Ph.D. in engineering mechanics at NCSU (1970). He was a postdoctoral fellow at the Norwegian University of Science & Technology ( (1984–85]) & the University of Edinburgh(2008).

== Research ==
He developed, tested and documented parallel analysis software to speed matrix equation solution to simulate physical & biological behavior on advanced-computer architectures (e.g. NASA's GPS solver based on prior Finite element machine and rapid parallel analysis of Space Shuttle SRB redesign earned Cray's 1st GigaFLOP Performance Award at Supercomputing '89).

== Books ==
- Engineering Applications on NASA's FPGA-based Hypercomputer, 7th MAPLD, Washington, D.C., Sept 2004.
- Large-Scale Analysis, Design and Intelligent Synthesis Environments, Elsevier Sciences, 2000.
- Large-Scale Analysis & Design on High-Performance Computers & Workstations, Elsevier Sciences, 1998.
- Large-Scale Structural Analysis for High-Performance Computers & Workstations, Pergamon Press 1994.
- Parallel Computational Methods for Large-Scale Structural Analysis & Design, Pergamon Press 1993.
- Parallel Methods on Large-Scale Structural Analysis & Physics Applications, Pergamon Press 1991.
