= Hans Zantema =

Dutch mathematician and computer scientist

Hans Zantema (1956 - 28 January 2025) was a Dutch mathematician and computer scientist, and professor at Radboud University in Nijmegen, known for his work on termination analysis.

== Biography ==
Born in Goingarijp, the Netherlands, Zantema received his PhD in algebraic number theory in 1983 at the University of Amsterdam under supervision of Hendrik Lenstra Jr. for the thesis, entitled "Integer Valued Polynomials in Algebraic Number Theory."

After graduation, Zantema spent a few years of employment in the industry before he switched to computer science: from 1987 to 2000 at Utrecht University and since 2000 at Eindhoven University of Technology.

Since 2007 he was also a part-time full professor at Radboud University in Nijmegen. His main achievements are in term rewriting systems, in particular in automatically proving termination of term rewriting. His name is attached to Zantema's problem, namely whether the string rewrite system 0011 -> 111000 terminates.

He also contributed to the theory and especially the visualisation of streams. This led to the book "Playing with Infinity".

== Selected publications ==
- Zantema, Hans. 1983. Integer Valued Polynomials in Algebraic Number Theory. PhD thesis
- Zantema, Hans. 2007 De achterkant van Sudoku. Oplossen, programmeren en ontwerpen. Aramith Hersengymnastiek.

Articles, a selection:

- Zantema, Hans. "Termination of term rewriting: interpretation and type elimination." Journal of Symbolic Computation 17.1 (1994): 23–50.
- Zantema, Hans. "Termination of term rewriting by semantic labelling." Fundamenta Informaticae 24.1 (1995): 89-105.
- Endrullis, Jörg, Johannes Waldmann, and Hans Zantema. "Matrix interpretations for proving termination of term rewriting." Journal of Automated Reasoning 40.2-3 (2008): 195–220.
