= Shaku Atre =

Indian data scientist (1940–2023)

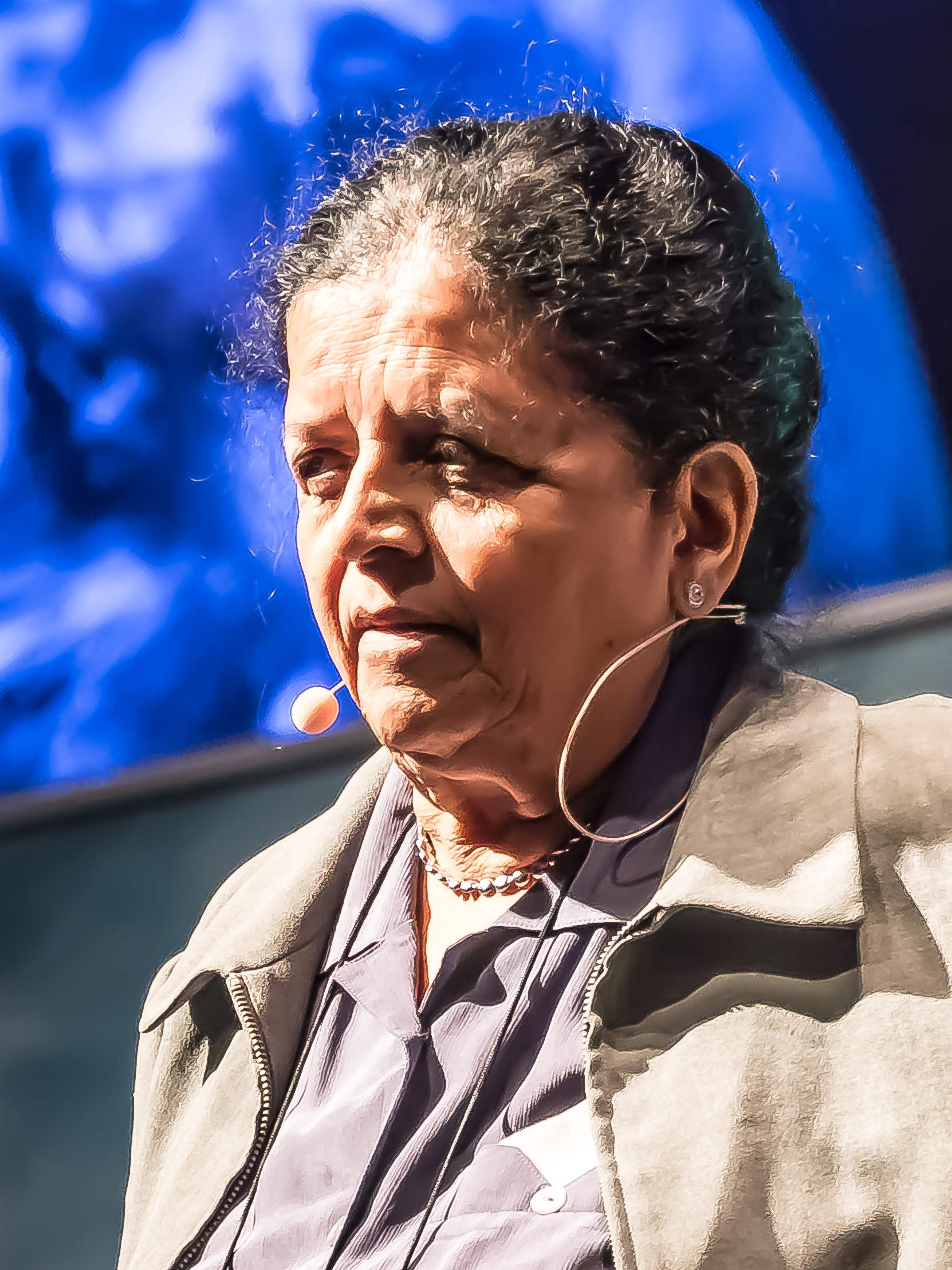
- Shaku Atre in 2016
- Born: Shakuntala Atre; 1940; India
- Died: November 2, 2024 (aged 83–84); New York, New York, U.S.
- Education: University of Poona; University of Heidelberg
- Occupations: Scientist, businesswoman

Shakuntala "Shaku" Atre (1940 – November 2, 2024) was an Indian data scientist and an American business woman. After a fourteen-year career with IBM, she began her own firm and became widely regarded as an expert on business technology and database use. Atre is best known for her books Database: Structured Techniques for Design, Performance and Management: With Case Studies (1980), one of the first books written on managing databases, and her co-authored book Business Intelligence Roadmap, written with Larissa Moss. She has served as an adjunct professor of data science at University of Pune and at several institutions in the United States. Her works have been used as university textbooks.

== Early life and education ==
Atre was born in 1940 in India into a Marathi family, and grew up in Panvel, a village near Mumbai. She earned a Master of Science from the University of Poona, studying mathematics and statistics. During her education, she also studied languages, gaining proficiency in speaking five different languages. Atre went on to begin her graduate studies in mathematics and physics at the University of Heidelberg, writing her thesis on astronomy. Because she needed to make large scale calculations to develop her thesis, she began studying computer programming, which led to an interest in the field of computer technology. During her studies, she was hired by IBM in 1967. When her student visa expired three and a half years later, Atre and her husband immigrated to the United States.

== Career ==
When they arrived in New York City in 1971, IBM had implemented a hiring freeze, but Atre was able to convince them she was not a new hire because she had worked for the company in Germany. They put her on staff as a systems programmer and she worked for the company for the next ten years, moving up the ladder from installation and technical support, to trainer in IBM's Systems Institute, to branch office systems engineer and finally, as a program manager for international product releases. (Note: Michael Iacuessa in his 2002 article says she worked for IBM for a decade. Both the Daily Item (1982) and Iacuessa in his 2001 article state it was 14 years; however, because she was already consulting in 1982, the fourteen year figure indicates her cumulative history including her work in Germany.) During her tenure at IBM, from 1977 to 1981, she served as one of the referees for the company’s Systems Journal, selecting which articles would be peer-reviewed for the publication. In 1980, she published Data Base: Structured Techniques for Design, Performance, and Management with Case Studies, which would be used as a university textbook. It was translated into several different languages and had sold more than 150,000 copies within its first two decades of publication. During this period, she also began teaching as an adjunct professor at various universities, including the Polytechnic Institute of New York.

In the last quarter of 1981, Atre left IBM and began operating her own business consulting firm and working part-time managing long-distance telephone databases for AT&T. The following year, she began writing articles for Computerworld, which in 2003 would become a regular column for the magazine. Her book Data Base Management Systems for the Eighties was published in 1983, and provided a discussion of eight different data systems, comparing features and business applications to assist readers in analyzing which systems best met their needs. From 1984, her expert opinion of various data systems was regularly sought by trade magazines, such as Infosystems, MIS Week, Network World, and Software News, among others.

In 1988, Atre sold her firm, Atre International Consultants, of Rye, New York to Computer Assistance, Inc. of Hartford, Connecticut. She was retained as president of Atre International, which operated as a branch of Computer Assistance, and became a consultant to the fifteen other national branches of the firm. The firm was acquired by Coopers Lybrand in 1989 and the following year, she negotiated a joint-venture with Intec, Inc. a software firm from Mumbai to develop utilities and training programs for use with Windows 3. In 1991, Atre published Distributed Databases, Cooperative Processing, and Networking, which became the basis for a series of seminars of the same name, which she presented at the Technology Transfer Institute in 1992. She became a contributing editor to the journal DBMS in 1994.

In 1998, Atre relocated to Santa Cruz, California, where her son had begun a web-based business, using her name-recognition in the industry to start his firm. From her new location, Atre operated both Atre Group, Inc. and Atre Associates. In 2003, she co-authored with Larissa Moss the book, Business Intelligence Roadmap: The Complete Project Lifecycle for Decision-Support Applications, which became frequently cited for its practical advice to business managers on how to integrate strategic company goals and varied business applications through database management. That same year, Atre and Robert Blumberg, president of Blumberg Consulting, were hired by DM Review magazine to publish a five-part series of articles on business intelligence. The articles were designed to give information to business managers on how unstructured data could be transformed into usable content for their industries.

Atre died on November 2, 2024, at the age of 83–84.

== Selected works ==
- Atre, S. (1980). Data Base: Structured Techniques for Design, Performance, and Management with Case Studies. New York, New York: Wiley. ISBN 978-0-471-05267-8.
- Atre, Shaku (1983). Data Base Management Systems for the Eighties. Wellesley, Massachusetts: QED Information Sciences. ISBN 978-0-89435-053-5.
- Atre, Shaku (1991). Distributed Databases, Cooperative Processing, and Networking (1st ed.). New York, New York: McGraw-Hill. ISBN 978-0-8306-2554-3.
- Moss, Larissa Terpeluk; Atre, Shaku (2003). Business Intelligence Roadmap: The Complete Project Lifecycle for Decision-Support Applications. Boston, Massachusetts: Addison-Wesley. ISBN 978-0-201-78420-6.
