= BCS-FACS =

Specialist Group of the BCS

- BCS Formal Aspects of Computing Science
- Abbreviation: FACS
- Named after: Formal methods
- Formation: 16 March 1978; 48 years ago
- Type: Specialist group
- Purpose: Support for formal methods activities, especially meetings
- Headquarters: BCS London office
- Location: London, United Kingdom
- Region served: United Kingdom
- Services: Meeting organization, publications
- Methods: Formal methods
- Fields: Computer science, software engineering, formal methods
- Official language: English
- Chair: Keith Lines
- Treasurer: Roger Carsley
- Secretary: Alvaro Miyazawa
- Key people: Jonathan Bowen, John Cooke, Tim Denvir, Jawed Siddiqi
- Main organ: FACS FACTS
- Parent organization: BCS, The Chartered Institute for IT
- Affiliations: Formal Methods Europe; London Mathematical Society
- Website: facs.bcs.org

BCS-FACS is the BCS Formal Aspects of Computing Science Specialist Group.

== Overview ==
The FACS group, inaugurated on 16 March 1978, organizes meetings for its members and others on formal methods and related computer science topics. There is an associated journal, Formal Aspects of Computing, published by Springer, and a more informal FACS FACTS newsletter.

The group celebrated its 20th anniversary with a meeting at the Royal Society in London in 1998, with presentations by four eminent computer scientists, Mike Gordon, Tony Hoare, Robin Milner and Gordon Plotkin, all Fellows of the Royal Society.

From 2002 to 2008 and 2013 to 2025, the Chair of BCS-FACS was Jonathan Bowen. Jawed Siddiqi was Chair during 2008–2013. In 2025, Keith Lines of the National Physical Laboratory became Chair. In December 2002, BCS-FACS organized a conference on the Formal Aspects of Security (FASec'02) at Royal Holloway, University of London. In 2004, FACS organized a major event at London South Bank University to celebrate its own 25th anniversary and also 25 Years of CSP (CSP25), attended by the originator of CSP, Sir Tony Hoare, and others in the field.

The group liaises with other related groups such as the Centre for Software Reliability, Formal Methods Europe, the London Mathematical Society Computer Committee, the Safety-Critical Systems Club, and the Z User Group. It has held joint meetings with other BCS specialist groups such as the Advanced Programming Group and BCSWomen.

FACS sponsors and supports meetings, such as the Refinement Workshop. It has often held a Christmas event each year, with a theme related to formal aspects of computing — for example, teaching formal methods and formal methods in industry. BCS-FACS supported the ABZ 2008 conference at the BCS London premises. In 2015, FACS hosted a two-day ProCoS Workshop on "Provably Correct Systems", with many former members of the ESPRIT ProCoS I and II projects and Working Group of the 1990s.

== Evening seminars ==
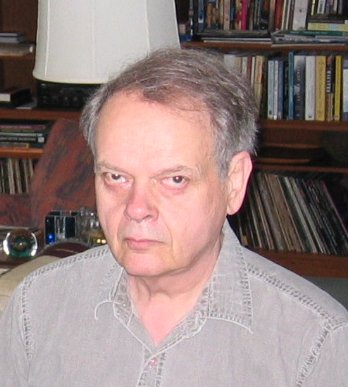
John C. Reynolds (1935–2013), American computer scientist, who delivered the first BCS-FACS Peter Landin Semantics Seminar in 2010.

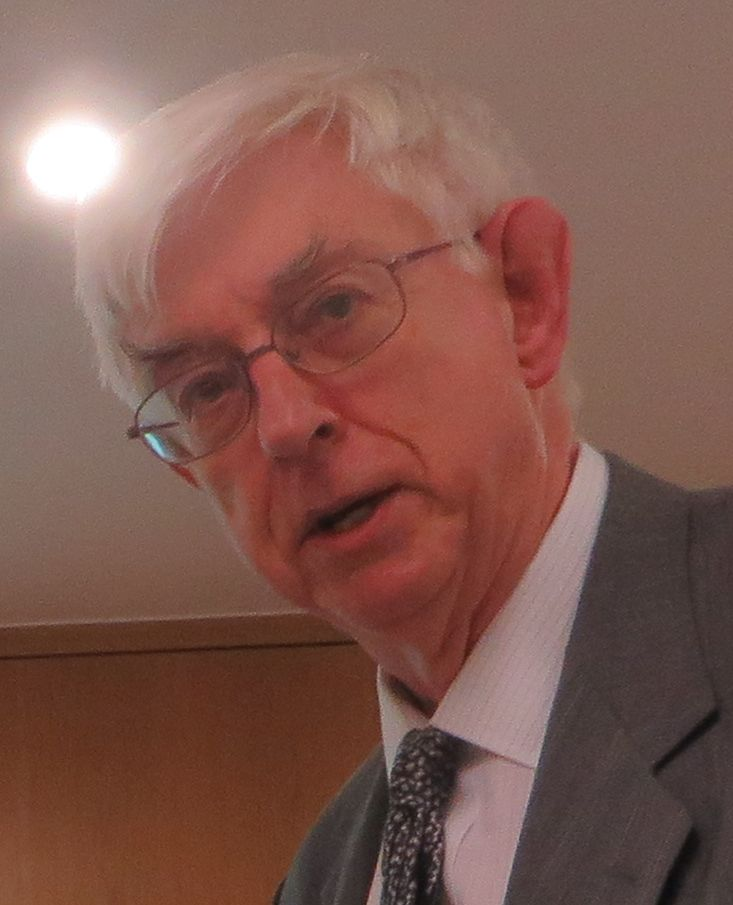
Joe Stoy speaking on the pioneer computer scientist Christopher Strachey (1916–1975) for his centenary, during a BCS-FACS evening seminar at the BCS London office on 15 November 2016.

In recent years, a series of evening seminars has been held, mainly at the BCS London office. Speakers have included leading computer scientists, mainly from the United Kingdom but some from abroad, including Samson Abramsky FRS, Jean-Raymond Abrial (France/Switzerland), Farhad Arbab, Troy Astarte, Dines Bjørner (Denmark), Robin Bloomfield, Richard Bornat (twice), Egon Börger (Italy), Jonathan Bowen (twice), Jan Broenink (Netherlands), Michael Butler, Muffy Calder OBE (twice), Jack Copeland (New Zealand), Tim Denvir, Cedric Fournet (France), Mike Gordon FRS, Anthony Hall, Mark Harman, Martin Henson, Rob Hierons, Jane Hillston, Mike Hinchey, Sir Tony Hoare FRS, Mike Holcombe, Michael Jackson, Cliff Jones, Marta Kwiatkowska (twice), Zhiming Liu, Tom Maibaum, Dame Ursula Martin, Peter Mosses, Ben Moszkowski, Peter O'Hearn FRS, Steve Reeves (New Zealand), John Reynolds (USA), Peter Ryan, Steve Schneider, Joe Stoy, David Turner, John Tucker, Phil Wadler, among others. In 2010, a book of chapters based on some of these talks was published. Talks have been held annually with Formal Methods Europe and the London Mathematical Society (at the LMS headquarters in central London). Since 2010, there has been an Annual Peter Landin Semantics Seminar held each December in memory of the British computer scientist Peter Landin (1930–2009).

== FACS FACTS newsletter ==
The FACS FACTS newsletter (ISSN 0950-1231) is published periodically, originally on paper and now online. The editors are Tim Denvir and Brian Monahan.

F. X. Reid was a regular FACS FACTS newsletter contributor in the past. For example, he has been an enthusiast for the COMEFROM statement and an expert on its semantics. Apparently reports of FXR's death in 2006 were untrue and his musings continued after this time in the newsletter.

== See also ==
- British Computer Society
- Formal methods
- Formal Methods Europe (FME)
- London Mathematical Society
