= Tim Denvir =

British software engineer

B. Tim Denvir
- Born: 1939 (age 86–87)
- Citizenship: British
- Education: Trinity College, Cambridge
- Known for: Software engineering, formal methods
- Awards: STL Creativity Award
- Scientific career
- Fields: Computer science
- Workplaces: Texas Instruments, Elliott Brothers, University of London, ICL, STL, Praxis, Brunel University, City University

Tim Denvir (born 1939) is a British software engineer, specialising in formal methods.

Denvir studied for a Mathematics degree at Trinity College, Cambridge during 1959–1962.

Before his degree, during 1958–1959, Tim Denvir was an engineering assistant at Texas Instruments, designing, building, and testing electronic circuits using discrete semiconductors. After his degree, during 1962–1965, he was a systems programmer with Elliott Brothers, programming operating systems and device drivers. During 1965–1969, he was a systems programmer at the University of London Atlas Computing Service, undertaking systems programming for the Atlas computer and compiler design. During 1969–1971, he was a project manager with RADICS, working on ALGOL 60 compilers.

During 1971–1972, Denvir was a principal technical officer at International Computers Limited (ICL), working on unifying compiler design for the ICL 2900 Series of mainframe computers. During 1972–1986, he was a department manager and then, from 1980, chief research engineer at the Standard Telecommunication Laboratories (STL), working on project management, technical education, and research. He won the STL Creativity Award. During 1986–1991, he was a senior/principal consultant at Praxis Systems plc, seconded for part of the time to the Information Technology Division of the UK Government Department of Trade and Industry (DTI). During 1991–2003, he was Director of Translimina Ltd.

Academically, during 1988–1989, Denvir was an Associate Reader at Brunel University, teaching formal methods. During 1992–1994, he was Honorary Visiting Professor at City University in London, where he developed and delivered a course on denotational semantics.

Denvir has been a member of the editorial board for the Formal Aspects of Computing journal (1989–2003) and the Springer FACIT book series. He was a member of the BSI IST/51-119 Vienna Development Method (VDM) Standardisation Committee. He was the Secretary of VDM Europe (1986–88 & 1991) and Chairman of the FACS Specialist Group (1993–1995). More recently, he has been editor of the associated FACS FACTS.

Tim Denvir has authored/edited/translated a number of books, including:

- The Analysis of Concurrent Systems (Springer, Lecture Notes in Computer Science 207, 1985, ISBN 3-540-16047-7), co-edited with W. T. Harwood, M. I. Jackson, and M. J. Wray
- Introduction to Discrete Mathematics for Software Engineering (Macmillan, Computer Science Series, 1986, ISBN 978-0333407370)
- Formal Aspects of Measurement (Springer, Workshops in Computing, 1991, ISBN 978-3540197881), co-edited with Rosalind Herman and Robin Whitty
- 5th Refinement Workshop (Springer, Workshops in Computing, 1992, ISBN 978-3540197522), co-edited with Cliff B. Jones and Roger C. Shaw
- FM'94: Industrial Benefit of Formal Methods (Springer, Lecture Notes in Computer Science, 1994, ISBN 978-3-540-58555-8, doi:10.1007/3-540-58555-9), co-edited with Maurice Naftalin and Miquel Bertran
- Carl Adam Petri: Life and Science (Springer, 2015, ISBN 978-3662480922), by Einar Smith, translated into English by the author and Tim Denvir

== Interests ==
Tim Denvir has been a keen hill-walker and "compleated" (in the parlance of the Scottish Mountaineering Club) all of the 282 Munros (the Scottish hills over 3,000 feet) in 2011, becoming Munroist number 4,855.
