= Peter Lucas (computer scientist) =

Austrian computer scientist and professor

- Born: 13 January 1935; Vienna, Austria
- Died: 2 February 2015 (aged 80); California, United States
- Education: Technical University of Vienna
- Known for: Formal methods, Vienna Definition Language (VDL)
- Awards: IBM Outstanding Contribution Award (1968)
- Scientific career
- Fields: Computer science
- Workplaces: IBM Laboratory Vienna; Thomas J. Watson Research Center; IBM Almaden Research Center; Technical University of Graz
- Thesis: Verbundkatalog: Zur Programmierung Elektronischer Rechenmaschinen (1959)

Peter Lucas (13 January 1935 in Vienna, Austria – 2 February 2015 in California, United States) was an Austrian computer scientist and university professor.

== Life ==
Peter Lucas graduated in 1953 and then studied telecommunications at the Vienna University of Technology. He completed his studies in 1959 with a diploma thesis on the topic of programming electronic calculating machines. Then he was a member of Heinz Zemanek's group and was responsible for the system programming of Mailüfterl, the first fully transistorized computer in continental Europe.

In 1961, he moved with the Mailüfterl Group from the Technical University to the IBM company, working at the IBM Laboratory Vienna, where he worked on the formal description of programming languages. Together with Hans Bekić, Kurt Walk, and Heinz Zemanek, he was responsible for the formal definition of the IBM programming language PL/I using the Vienna Definition Language (VDL), an important part of the formal method VDM. In addition, he worked together with Hans Bekić on a compiler for ALGOL 60. During this time, he gave lectures and lectures at the Vienna University of Technology and the Johannes Kepler University Linz, covering theoretical foundations of programming and the formal definition of programming languages.

In 1978, he joined the Thomas J. Watson Research Center at Yorktown Heights, New York, United States, where he worked on experimental compiler projects. In 1979, he moved to IBM in San Jose, California, later the IBM Almaden Research Center. In 1988, he worked in John Backus' group on the definition and implementation of the functional programming language FL.

In October 1993, he was appointed as a full professor in software technology at the Graz University of Technology, retiring to an emeritus position in July 2001. From 1994, he was chairman of Formal Methods Europe (FME) and corresponding member of the Austrian Academy of Sciences.

Peter Lucas died on 2 February 2015 at the age of 80.

== Awards ==
- 1968: IBM Outstanding Contribution Award for the formal specification of PL/I
- 1969: Association for Computing Machinery: ACM Best Paper (together with Kurt Walk)
- 1987: Honorary Doctorate at the Johannes Kepler University Linz
