= John Fitzgerald (computer scientist) =

British computer scientist

John S. Fitzgerald FBCS (born 1965) is a British computer scientist. He is a professor at Newcastle University. He was the head of the School of Computing before taking on the role of Dean of Strategic Projects in the university’s Faculty of Science, Agriculture and Engineering. His research interests are in the area of dependable computer systems and formal methods, with a background in the VDM. He is a former Chair of Formal Methods Europe and committee member of BCS-FACS.

== Education ==
Fitzgerald was born in Belfast, Northern Ireland, and was educated at Bangor Grammar School and the Victoria University of Manchester. He holds the BSc in Computing and Information Systems and the PhD degrees from the Department of Computer Science at Manchester.

== Selected books ==
- Bicarregui, J.C., Fitzgerald, J.S. and Lindsay, P.A. et al., Proof in VDM: a Practitioner's Guide. Springer-Verlag Formal Approaches to Computing and Information Technology (FACIT), 1994. ISBN 3-540-19813-X.
- Fitzgerald, J.S. and Larsen, P.G., Modelling Systems: Practical Tools and Techniques in Software Engineering. Cambridge University Press, 1998. ISBN 0-521-62348-0. (Japanese Edition pub. Iwanami Shoten, 2003. ISBN 4-00-005609-3.)
- Fitzgerald, J.S., Larsen, P.G., Mukherjee, P. et al., Validated Designs for Object-oriented Systems. Springer-Verlag, 2005. ISBN 1-85233-881-4.

== See also ==
Colleagues at Newcastle University:

- Cliff Jones
- Brian Randell
