= Martin Henson =

Martin Henson may refer to:

- Martin Henson (computer scientist)
- Martin Henson (photographer)
