= FXR =

FXR may refer to:

- Farnesoid X receptor
- Foxer, a World War II torpedo countermeasure
- F. X. Reid, pseudonym of British computer science academic Mike W. Shields
