= Ernst Rothauser =

Austrian computer scientist (1931–2015)

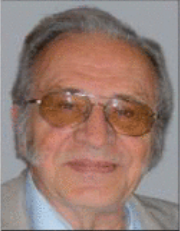
- Ernst Rothauser in 2014
- Born: 7 July 1931; Vienna, Austria
- Died: 4 August 2015 (aged 84); Reichenburg, Swiss
- Known for: Vocoder
- Scientific career
- Fields: Computer Scientist
- Workplaces: Vienna University of Technology, IBM Zurich Research Laboratory

Ernst Rothauser (7 July 1931 – 4 August 2015) was an Austrian computer scientist. As member of Heinz Zemanek's "Mailüfterl-Team", he worked on the country's first transistor computer. After finishing his dissertation he was hired by IBM Zurich Research Laboratory, retiring in 1995.

== Career ==
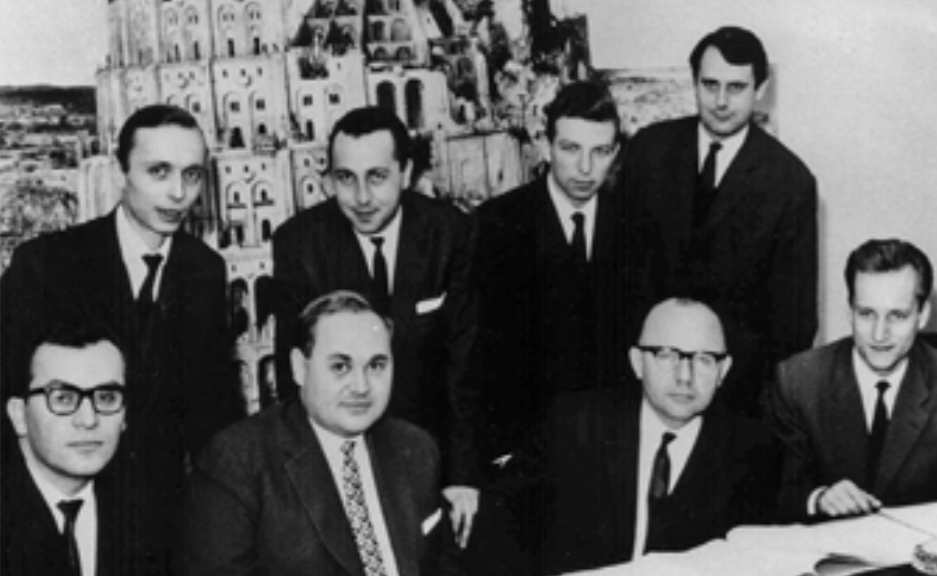
Team Mailüfterl

Rothauser worked on the Mailüfterl with Zemanek and a team of students. In 1960, he finished his dissertation about the Vocoder at TU Wien. It was first used in the Siemens studio for electronic music, before being used in popular music in the 1970s.

Rothauser owned several patents patented by the IBM Research Laboratory Zurich, including one for a network switches.

== Work ==
=== Projects ===
- Crossing from HOST-Services to Client-Server-Architecture (1990–1995) for the IBM-Laboratories Zurich/Rüschlikon – ""

=== Patents ===
- Arrangement for the alteration of the fundamental tone, speech rate and tone of voice signals analyzed by the vocoder principle 1965
- US-Patent "Device for excitation controlled smoothing of the spectrum-channel signals of a vocoder, 1969, US 3431355 A
- "Method and apparatus for controlling access to a communication network",
- "Flow control mechanism for block switching nodes", Philippe A. Janson, Hans R. Muller, Ernst H. Rothauser,
- "Data Retrieval System for replying to inquiries in synthesized vocal sound", Ernst Rothauser, Weil I. Schonbuch, Helmut Lamparter, Kurt Bergmann, Guenter Knauft, Wilhelm Spruth,
- Method and arrangement for message transmission using the vocoder principle, DE1215209 B

=== Publications ===
- "Pulse method to transmit speech using the vocoder principle". Dissertation at TU Wien, 1960
- "The integrated vocoder and its application in computer systems", 1966 IBM Journal of Research and Development
- "IEEE Standard Method for Measurement of Weighted Peak Flutter of Sound Recording and Reproducing Equipment", 1972, ISSN 0018-9278
- "IEEE An Effective Scheduling Algorithm for Parallel. Transaction Processing Systems", ISBN 0-7803-3725-5
- "IEEE Recommended Practice for Speech Quality Measurements", Rothauser, 2003, ISSN 0018-9278
- "History-Based Batch Job Scheduling on Workstation Clusters", Rothauser, Wespi, 1997
- "Simulated Vocoder Analysis", Ernst Rothauser, Dietrich Maiwald, 1968 Acoustical Society of America
- "History-Based Batch Job Scheduling on Workstation Clusters", Andreas Wespi, Ernst Rothauser
