= Integrated project =

Integrated project may refer to:

- Integrated Project (EU), a form of collaborative research project funded by the European Commission
- Integrated Project, a project undertaken to earn an academic degree, similar to a thesis but typically interdisciplinary
- Integrated Project Delivery, a business project delivery method
- Integrated Project Support Environment, a set of management and technical tools which support software development
