= Rothauser =

Rothauser is a surname. Notable people with the surname include:

- Eduard Rothauser (1876–1956), Hungarian-born German actor
- Ernst Rothauser (1931–2015), Austrian computer scientist
