= Z User Group =

Group to promote the Z notation

- Abbreviation: ZUG
- Named after: Z notation
- Formation: 14 December 1992; 33 years ago
- Founder: John Nicholls
- Founded at: London, England
- Type: User group
- Purpose: Support for Z notation activities, especially meetings
- Location: Oxford, United Kingdom
- Region served: International
- Services: Conference organization
- Methods: Z notation
- Fields: Computer science, software engineering, formal methods
- Official language: English
- Chair: Steve Reeves
- Secretary: Randolph Johnson
- Key people: John Nicholls; Jonathan Bowen; Mike Hinchey; Steve King
- Main organ: Conference proceedings
- Affiliations: Formal Methods Europe
- Website: zuser.org

The Z User Group (ZUG) was established in 1992 to promote use and development of the Z notation, a formal specification language for the description of and reasoning about computer-based systems. It was formally constituted on 14 December 1992 during the ZUM'92 Z User Meeting in London, England.

== Meetings and conferences ==
In 1985, the Z Users Meeting series was instigated by Ib Holm Sørensen (1949–2012), initially at Rewley House in Oxford. In 1991, the meeting moved to be organized by the University of York. From 1992, on its establishment, ZUG continued this series as a regular Z User Workshop (aka Z User Meeting, ZUM), approximately every 18 months initially. From 2000, these became the ZB Conference (jointly with the B-Method, co-organized with APCB), and from 2008 the ABZ Conference (with abstract state machines as well). In 2010, the ABZ Conference also includes Alloy, a Z-like specification language with associated tool support.

In 1999, the Z User Group participated in the FM'99 World Congress on Formal Methods in Toulouse, France. The group and the associated Z notation have been studied as a community of practice.

== List of proceedings ==
The following proceedings were produced by the Z User Group:

- Bowen, J.P.; Nicholls, J.E., eds. (1993). Z User Workshop, London 1992, Proceedings of the Seventh Annual Z User Meeting, 14–15 December 1992. Springer, Workshops in Computing. ISBN 978-0387198187
- Bowen, J.P.; Hall, J.A., eds. (1994). Z User Workshop, Cambridge 1994, Proceedings of the Eighth Annual Z User Meeting, 29–30 June 1994. Springer, Workshops in Computing. ISBN 978-3540198840
- Bowen, J.P.; Hinchey, M.G, eds. (1995). ZUM '95: The Z Formal Specification Notation, 9th International Conference of Z Users, Limerick, Ireland, September 7–9, 1995. Springer, Lecture Notes in Computer Science, Volume 967. ISBN 978-3540602712
- Bowen, J.P.; Hinchey, M.G.; Till, D., eds. (1997). ZUM '97: The Z Formal Specification Notation, 10th International Conference of Z Users, Reading, UK, April 3–4, 1997. Springer, Lecture Notes in Computer Science, Volume 1212. ISBN 978-3540627173
- Bowen, J.P.; Fett, A.; Hinchey, M.G., eds. (1998). ZUM '98: The Z Formal Specification Notation, 11th International Conference of Z Users, Berlin, Germany, September 24–26, 1998. Springer, Lecture Notes in Computer Science, Volume 1493. ISBN 978-3540650706

The following ZB conference proceedings were jointly produced with the Association de Pilotage des Conférences B (APCB), covering the Z notation and the related B-Method:

- Bowen, J.P.; Dunne, S.; Galloway, A.; King. S., eds. (2000). ZB 2000: Formal Specification and Development in Z and B, First International Conference of B and Z Users, York, UK, August 29 – September 2, 2000. Springer, Lecture Notes in Computer Science, Volume 1878. ISBN 978-3540679448
- Bert, D.; Bowen, J.P.; Henson, M.C.; Robinson, K., eds. (2002). ZB 2002: Formal Specification and Development in Z and B: 2nd International Conference of B and Z Users Grenoble, France, January 23–25, 2002. Springer, Lecture Notes in Computer Science, Volume 2272. ISBN 978-3540431664
- Bert, D.; Bowen, J.P.; King, S.; Walden, M., eds. (2003). ZB 2003: Formal Specification and Development in Z and B: Third International Conference of B and Z Users, Turku, Finland, June 4–6, 2003. Springer, Lecture Notes in Computer Science, Volume 2651. ISBN 978-3540402534
- Treharne, H.; King, S.; Henson, M.C.; Schneider, S., eds. (2005). ZB 2005: Formal Specification and Development in Z and B: 4th International Conference of B and Z Users, Guildford, UK, April 13–15, 2005. Springer, Lecture Notes in Computer Science, Volume 3455. ISBN 978-3540255598

From 2008, the ZB conferences were expanded to be the ABZ conference, also including abstract state machines.

== Chair and secretary ==
Successive chairs have been:

- John Nicholls (1992–1994)
- Jonathan Bowen (1994–2011)
- Steve Reeves (2011–)

Successive secretaries have been:

- Mike Hinchey (1994–2011)
- Randolph Johnson (2011–)

== See also ==
- Formal methods
