= Margaret Puxon =

English gynaecologist, obstetrician and barrister

Christine Margaret Puxon QC FRCOG
- Born: Margaret Hale; 25 July 1915; West Bromwich, England
- Died: 1 April 2008 (aged 92); London, England
- Education: Birmingham University
- Occupations: barrister, gynaecologist, obstetrician, author, judge
- Years active: 1942–c. 1950s as physician 1952–1993 as barrister
- Medical career
- Profession: Physician
- Field: Gynaecology, Obstetrics
- Institutions: Queen Elizabeth Hospital Birmingham

Christine Margaret Puxon QC FRCOG (née Hale; 25 July 1915 – 1 April 2008) was an English barrister, gynaecologist and obstetrician. She began her career as a gynaecologist and obstetrician and later took up law, specialising in family law and medical negligence.

== Early life and medical career ==
Margaret Hale was born on 25 July 1915 in West Bromwich to Reginald Wood Hale, an iron merchant, and Clara Lilian (née Poulton). She was raised in Stourbridge and attended Abbey College in Malvern, Worcestershire. Turning down a place at Oxford University, she instead chose to read veterinary medicine at Birmingham University, later transferring to medicine. She married her first husband, Ralph Weddell, in 1937, and had two children as a student without interrupting her studies. She graduated in 1942 with a gold medal in obstetrics and gynaecology. After graduating, she was a house officer and then a gynaecology registrar at the Queen Elizabeth Hospital Birmingham. She married her second husband Peter Puxon, a solicitor, in 1944 and moved to Colchester. She passed her membership examination for the Royal College of Obstetricians and Gynaecologists (MRCOG) in 1946; the next year, she received an MD in obstetrics from Birmingham University and was made a consultant gynaecologist by Essex County Council.

== Legal career ==
When Puxon became pregnant with her third child in 1949, she was advised to take time off work because she had had two earlier miscarriages. To avoid boredom, she started a correspondence course in law which she completed after her son was born. She later moved to London, where she was offered a pupillage. When she was called to the bar in 1954, a clerk warned her that he would not give her any work; she initially made a living by taking on legal aid cases and divorce cases for returned servicemen, cases that were undesirable to most other barristers. She married her third husband, Morris Williams, also a solicitor, in 1955, though she continued to use her second married name, Puxon. She established a divorce practice and gradually built a reputation in family law; she represented the Rolling Stones bassist Bill Wyman in his divorce from singer Mandy Smith, and in J v C she represented an adopting mother in a case where the natural mother wished to regain custody of a child she had put up for adoption.

In the 1970s, Puxon switched interests from family law to medical negligence, typically representing plaintiffs; her dual qualifications in medicine and law gave her a niche advantage in this area. She provided advice to Bourn Hall Clinic, an infertility clinic, about the wording of consent contracts for sperm and egg donors. When the Family Planning Association was threatened with legal action, they consulted Puxon about whether the prescription of the morning-after pill was equivalent to providing an abortion; Puxon advised that if the pill was used within 72 hours, its use did not amount to abortion by the meaning of the law because the ovum had not yet implanted in the wall of the uterus.

Puxon was elected a Fellow of the Royal College of Obstetricians and Gynaecologists in 1979 and was appointed as Queen's Counsel in 1982. She was a deputy circuit judge from 1970 to 1986, and a recorder from 1986 until her retirement in 1993. Although she had left obstetric and gynaecological practice by the 1950s, she continued to contribute to leading medical textbooks including Progress in Obstetrics and Gynaecology (1983), In Vitro Fertilisation: Past, Present and Future (1986), Gynaecology (1991), and Safe Practice in Obstetrics and Gynaecology (1994).

== Death ==
Puxon died from pneumonia on 1 April 2008 at King Edward VII's Hospital in London.
