= Martin Henson (computer scientist) =

English computer scientist

Martin C. Henson
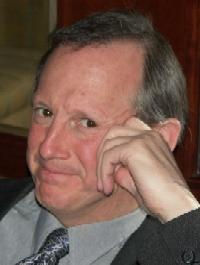
- Born: 14 October 1954 (age 71); Reading, England, UK
- Education: University of Southampton; University of Reading; University of Essex
- Scientific career
- Fields: Computer science, formal methods, academic accreditation, international development
- Workplaces: University of Essex

Martin C. Henson (born 14 October 1954 in Reading) is an English computer scientist based at the University of Essex. He is dean for international affairs and is affiliated to the School of Computer Science & Electronic Engineering. Henson was head of the department of computer science from 2000 to 2006.

== Education ==
Martin Henson was educated at The Bulmershe School in Woodley, Berkshire, at the University of Southampton (BSc, 1976), at the University of Reading (PGCE, 1977), and the University of Essex (MSc, 1981).

== Academic research ==
Henson's academic work is in the area of formal methods to aid software engineering. His early work was in programming language semantics, especially using algebraic approaches for structuring compiler and interpreter generation from semantic descriptions. He moved on to work in functional languages, focusing on program verification and transformation, pioneering an approach to program transformation, adapted from work in semantic equivalences, using higher-order generalisations and relational constraints. Since the late 1990s, he has undertaken research into the design and use of logic in specification and program development. With Steve Reeves, he has studied the formal semantics of the Z notation in detail. This work was used in the international ISO standard for the Z notation. Most recently he has proposed a new approach to specification, based on specification theories, developing the specification logic nuZ – a Z-like specification language with a monotonic schema calculus. This was first presented in a talk in the BCS-FACS seminar series at the British Computer Society in London in 2005.

Henson has been a Fellow of the British Computer Society since 2009 and holds a Visiting Professorship at the University of Waikato in New Zealand.

== International development ==
Henson ran a blog on his activities as Dean at Essex University. He has worked internationally on academic accreditation, institutional licensure and strategic planning, with a focus on the Middle East and particularly for the Commission for Academic Accreditation in the United Arab Emirates. He is an external reviewer for the Oman Academic Accreditation Authority in Muscat, Oman, and has been a Fellow of the Royal Society of Arts since 2010.

Professor Henson has given keynote addresses on outcomes-based curriculum development, in Saudi Arabia, on institutional research strategic planning in Indonesia, and on the internationalisation of higher education in China. His other international consultancy has included Jordan, Kuwait, the West Indies, and Sweden.

== Selected publications ==
- Martin C. Henson and Steve Reeves, Revising Z: Part I – Logic and Semantics. Formal Aspects of Computing, 11(4):359–380, 1999.
- Martin C. Henson and Steve Reeves. Revising Z: Part II – Logical Development. Formal Aspects of Computing, 11(4):381–401, 1999.
- Martin C. Henson, Steve Reeves and Jonathan P. Bowen, Z Logic and its Consequences. CAI: Computing and Informatics, 22(4):381–415, 2003. In Dines Bjørner (editor), special issue on The Logics of Formal Specification Languages.
- Martin C. Henson, Besnik Kajtazi and Moshe Deutsch, The specification logic nuZ, Formal Aspects of Computing, special issue on Refinement, 18(3):364–395, 2007.
- Martin C. Henson, Moshe Deutsch and Steve Reeves, Z Logic and its Applications. In Martin C. Henson and Dines Bjørner (editors), Logics of Specification Languages, EATCS Monographs in Theoretical Computer Science, 489–596, Springer, 2008.
- Martin C. Henson, Applications and Methodology of nuZ. In Paul Boca, Jonathan P. Bowen, Jawed I. Siddiqi (editors), Formal Methods: State of the Art and New Directions, 117–146, Springer, 2010.

== Books ==
- Martin C. Henson, Elements of Functional Languages, Blackwell Scientific Publications, 1987.
- Bert, D., Bowen, J.P., Henson, M.C., Robinson, K. (editors), ZB 2002: Formal Specification and Development in Z and B, 2nd International Conference of B and Z Users, Lecture Notes in Computer Science, Vol. 2272, 2002.
- Treharne, H.; King, S.; Henson, M.; Schneider, S. (editors), ZB 2005: Formal Specification and Development in Z and B, 4th International Conference of B and Z Users, Lecture Notes in Computer Science, Vol. 3455, 2005.
- Martin C. Henson and Dines Bjørner (editors), Logics of Specification Languages, EATCS Monographs in Theoretical Computer Science, Springer, 2008.
