= Ursula Martin =

British computer scientist (born 1953)

Dame Ursula Martin DBE FRSE FREng
- Born: Ursula Hilda Mary Martin; 3 August 1953 (age 72); London, UK
- Citizenship: British
- Education: Abbey College, Malvern
- Alma mater: University of Cambridge (MA); University of Warwick (PhD)
- Spouse: Peter J. Webb (m. 1975)
- Awards: Suffrage Science award (2018)
- Scientific career
- Fields: Mathematics; Computer Science
- Institutions: University of Illinois at Urbana-Champaign; University of Manchester; Royal Holloway, University of London; University of St Andrews; Queen Mary, University of London; University of Cambridge; University of Oxford; University of Edinburgh
- Thesis: Automorphisms of Finitely-Generated Nilpotent Groups (1979)
- Doctoral advisor: Stewart E. Stonehewer
- Website: people.maths.ox.ac.uk/martinu/

Dame Ursula Hilda Mary Martin (born 3 August 1953) is a British computer scientist, with research interests in theoretical computer science and formal methods. She is also known for her activities aimed at encouraging women in the fields of computing and mathematics. Since 2019, she has served as a professor at the School of Informatics, University of Edinburgh.

From 2014–2018, Martin was a professor of computer science in the Department of Computer Science at the University of Oxford, and holds an EPSRC Established Career Fellowship. Prior to this she held a chair of Computer Science in the School of Electronic Engineering and Computer Science at Queen Mary, University of London, where she was Vice-Principal of Science and Engineering, 2005–2009.

== Education ==
Martin was born in London on 3 August 1953 to Anne Louise (née Priestman) and Captain Geoffrey Richard Martin. She was educated at Abbey College at Malvern Wells. In 1975 she graduated with an MA from Girton College, Cambridge, and in 1979 with a PhD from the University of Warwick, both in mathematics.

== Career and research ==
Martin began in mathematics working in group theory, later moving into string rewriting systems. She has held academic posts at University of Illinois at Urbana-Champaign, the University of Manchester and Royal Holloway, University of London. She has made sabbatical visits to Massachusetts Institute of Technology and SRI International (Menlo Park). In 2004 she was a visiting fellow at the Oxford Internet Institute.

From 1992 to 2002, Martin was Professor of Computer Science at the University of St Andrews in Scotland. She was the second female professor at the University, following Margaret Fairlie (Professor of Obstetrics and Gynaecology, 1940), since its foundation in 1411.

From 2003 to 2005, Martin was seconded to the University of Cambridge Computer Laboratory part-time and served as the director of the Women@CL project to lead local, national and international initiatives for women in computing, supported by Microsoft Research and Intel Cambridge Research. She was a Fellow of Newnham College, Cambridge.

From 2014 to 2023, Martin was principal investigator on the EPSRC project The Social Machine of Mathematics on mathematics as a large-scale collaborative enterprise between humans and computers. She was one of the organisers of the Big Proof programme series held at the Isaac Newton Institute in 2017 and 2025, and at the International Centre for Mathematical Sciences in 2019.

Martin has served as an advisory editor for the Annals of Pure and Applied Logic journal (published by Elsevier) and on the editorial boards for The Journal of Computation and Mathematics (London Mathematical Society) and Formal Aspects of Computing (Springer-Verlag).

=== Publications ===
Her publications include:

- with Christopher Hollings and Adrian Rice, Ada Lovelace: The Making of a Computer Scientist, Oxford: The Bodleian Library, 2018, 114 pp. ISBN 978-1851244881

=== Honours and awards ===
Martin was appointed Commander of the Order of the British Empire (CBE) in the 2012 New Year Honours for services to computer science. In 2017 she was elected a Fellow of the Royal Society of Edinburgh (FRSE) and the Royal Academy of Engineering (FREng). In 2025 she was appointed Dame Commander of the Order of the British Empire (DBE) in the King's 2025 Birthday Honours for services to computer science.

== Personal life ==
In 1975, she married Peter J. Webb.
