= Denvir =

Denvir is a surname. Notable people with the surname include:

- The Most Reverend Cornelius Denvir DD (1791–1865), Irish Roman Catholic prelate, mathematician, and natural philosopher
- John Denvir (American football) (born John William Denvir), American football player
- John Denvir (soldier) DCM (1913–1973), New Zealand soldier
- Kieran Denvir (1932–2022), Gaelic footballer from Northern Ireland
- Tim Denvir (born 1939), British software engineer

== See also ==
- Laura Denvir Stith (born 1953), American judge on the Supreme Court of Missouri
