= Advanced Programming Specialist Group =

The Advanced Programming Specialist Group (APSG) is a Specialist Group (SG) of the British Computer Society (BCS). It held its first meeting, when it was referred to as "BCS Study Group No. 5", at Bishop's House, High Holborn, London WC1, England, on 17 December 1959. It has met continuously in London since then, generally on the second Thursday of the months from October to May each year.

APSG seeks to explore new developments in programming languages, runtime environments, programming tools, multicore processors, mobile platforms and end user interfaces which are important to today's real world applications.

Past chairmen of the Group were Ewart Willey (first chairman 1959–1974), Prof. Peter King (1974–1980), Peter Prowse (1980–1982), Prof. John Florentin (1982–2010), Prof. Geoff Sharman (2010–2014), and Rob Packwood (2014–2016). The current chairman is Prof Algirdas Pakštas.

From time to time, the Group holds joint meetings with other BCS SGs and Branches, for example:

- February 2013, with Enterprise Architecture SG, What is Enterprise Architecture?
- January 2013, with Formal Aspects SG (BCS-FACS), Industrial Uses of Formal Methods
- May 2010, with Fortran SG, Parallel Programming in Fortran with Coarrays
- January 2010 with Computer Conservation Society, The 50th Anniversary of the publication of the Algol 60 Report
- October 2006, with Computer Conservation Society, The first 35+ years of IBM Hursley software
- November 2005, with Formal Aspects SG (BCS-FACS), Separation Logic
