= Joe Stoy =

British computer scientist

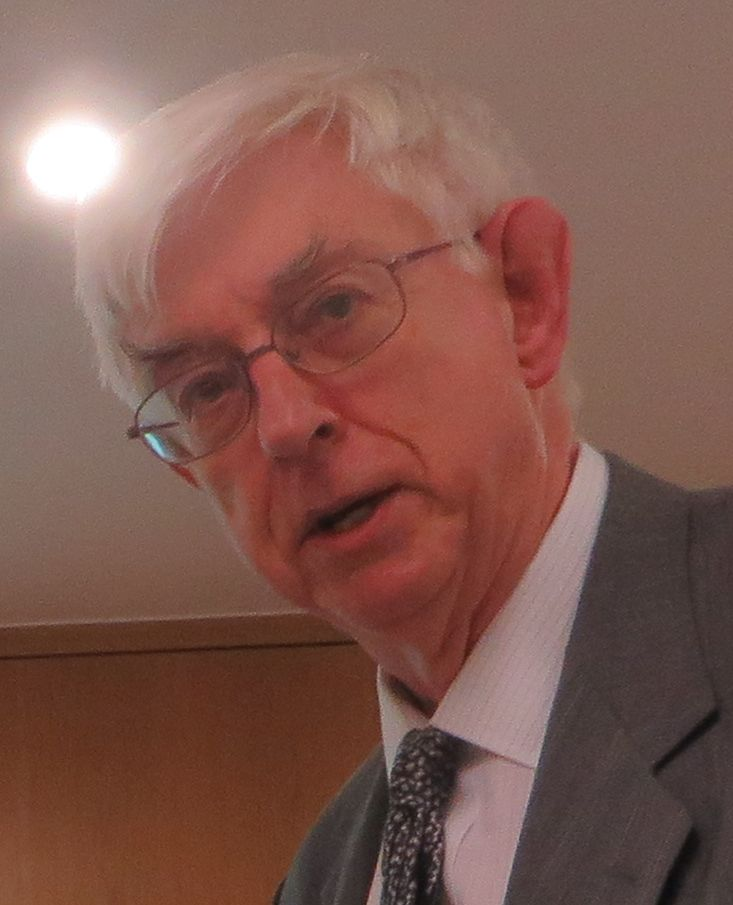
- Joe Stoy speaking on Christopher Strachey during a British Computer Society Formal Aspects of Computing Science (BCS-FACS) evening seminar, London office, 15 November 2016
- Born: Joseph E. Stoy; United Kingdom
- Education: Oxford University
- Known for: Denotational semantics with Christopher Strachey; Denotational Semantics: The Scott-Strachey Approach to Programming Language Semantics; Bluespec, Inc.
- Spouse: Gabrielle Stoy
- Scientific career
- Fields: Computer science
- Institutions: Programming Research Group, Oxford University; MIT; Bluespec, Inc.

Joseph E. Stoy is a British computer scientist. He initially studied physics at Oxford University. Early in his career, in the 1970s, he worked on denotational semantics with Christopher Strachey in the Programming Research Group at the Oxford University Computing Laboratory (now the Oxford University Department of Computer Science). He was a Fellow of Balliol College, Oxford. He has also spent time at the Massachusetts Institute of Technology (MIT) in the United States.

In 2003, he co-founded Bluespec, Inc., a United States electronic design automation company. It provides a functional programming language named Bluespec SystemVerilog (BSV), a Haskell variant extended as a high-level hardware description language to design electronic chips.

His book Denotational Semantics: The Scott-Strachey Approach to Programming Language Semantics (MIT Press, 1977) is now a classic text.

Stoy married Gabrielle Stoy, a mathematician and Fellow of Lady Margaret Hall, Oxford.
