= IBM Laboratory Vienna =

Austrian research laboratory

IBM Laboratory Vienna was an IBM research laboratory based in Vienna, Austria.

The laboratory started with a group led by Heinz Zemanek that moved from the Technische Hochschule (now the Technical University of Vienna). Initially, the group worked on computer hardware projects. Later a compiler for the ALGOL 60 programming language was produced. The group built on ideas of Calvin C. Elgot, Peter Landin, and John McCarthy, to create an operational semantics that could define the whole of IBM's PL/I programming language. The meta-language used for this was dubbed by people outside the laboratory as the Vienna Definition Language (VDL). These descriptions were used for compiler design research into compiler design during 1968–70.

The formal method VDM (Vienna Development Method) was a result of research at the laboratory by Dines Bjørner, Cliff Jones, Peter Lucas, and others.

== See also ==
- IBM Research
