= Altran Praxis =

British software company

Altran UK (formerly known as Altran Praxis, Praxis High Integrity Systems, Praxis Critical Systems, Altran Xype, Xype and Altran Technologies) was a division of parent company Altran. Altran Praxis was a British software house that specialised in critical systems. This role is continued under the banner of high-tech engineering consultancy services provided by the rest of the Altran group.

The division formerly known as Praxis (the critical systems specialists) was based in SouthGate, Bath, England, close to Bath Spa railway station, and also had offices in London, Loughborough, Paris, Sophia Antipolis, and Bangalore.

== History ==
=== Praxis Systems ===
The company Praxis Systems Limited was founded by Martyn Thomas and David Bean in 1983: it was incorporated on 1 June 1983 and commenced business on 1 July 1983, presenting itself as a software engineering company. On 28 June 1985 it became a Public limited company Praxis Systems plc. In 1987, a company group structure was created under the renamed company Praxis plc.

Until 1988, Praxis was owned almost entirely by its staff, and provided a staff profit-sharing scheme. In 1988 Praxis obtained venture capital finance in order to provide funds for future acquisitions and working capital for continued growth. On 27 November 1992 Praxis was acquired by Deloitte Consulting (then known as Touche Ross), an international firm of accountants and management consultants. The business continued to operate under the Praxis name.

Praxis' first project was to develop a field trial Unix subsystem embedded in the mainframe operating system ICL VME, named VNS, which ICL later developed into the VME/X and OpenVME versions of the mainframe operating system.

In the late 1980s and 1990s, Praxis Systems commercialised and supported the electronic hardware description language ELLA used to describe, verify and manage very-large-scale integration circuit designs.

A distinguishing feature of the former Praxis office's is its extensive use of formal methods such as the Z notation and the SPARK toolset (acquired through the takeover of the developers Program Validation Limited in 1994) in its approach to improving the reliability of software engineering. A major project using Z has been an enhancement for the United Kingdom's National Air Traffic Services (NATS).

=== Critical systems division purchase by Altran ===
The critical systems division was acquired by the Altran Group in 1997. The commercial and industrial systems division was retained by Deloitte, but the use of the Praxis name by Deloitte ceased soon thereafter.

In 2004, Praxis Critical Systems and HIS Consulting merged to form Praxis High Integrity Systems. In January 2010, the company was merged with SC2 by Altran to form Altran Praxis. The company has since been rebranded to Altran along with Altran Xype and Altran Technologies. In December 2012, AdaCore along with Altran Praxis released SPARK Pro 11. In 2013, Altran acquired Sentaca, a specialty telecoms consultancy.

== See also ==
- Anthony Hall, a former employee, now a consultant
- IPSE (Praxis was a key participant in the influential IPSE2.5 project)
