= TRADIC =

First transistorized computer in the USA

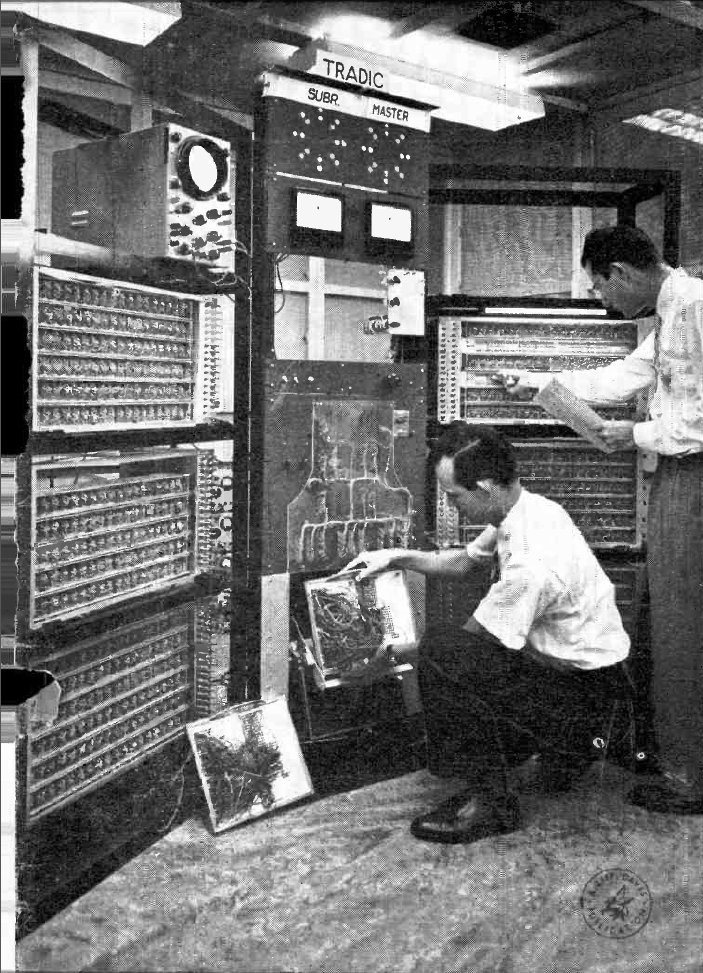
- Prototype of TRADIC at Bell Labs, 1955. Felker is at left and James R. Harris is at right
- Manufacturer: Bell Labs
- Released: January 1954

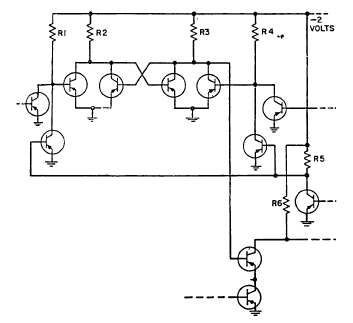
Direct-coupler transistor logic (DCTL) circuit of the Leprechaun computer

The TRADIC (for TRAnsistor DIgital Computer or TRansistorized Airborne DIgital Computer) was the first transistorized computer in the US, completed in 1954.

The computer was built by Jean Howard Felker of Bell Labs for the United States Air Force while L.C. Brown ("Charlie Brown") was a lead engineer on the project, which started in 1951. The project initially examined the feasibility of constructing a transistorized airborne digital computer. A second application was a transistorized digital computer to be used in a Navy track-while-scan shipboard radar system. Several models were completed: TRADIC Phase One computer, Flyable TRADIC, Leprechaun (using germanium alloy junction transistors in 1956) and XMH-3 TRADIC. TRADIC Phase One was developed to explore the feasibility, in the laboratory, of using transistors in a digital computer that could be used to solve aircraft bombing and navigation problems. Flyable TRADIC was used to establish the feasibility of using an airborne solid-state computer as the control element of a bombing and navigation system. Leprechaun was a second-generation laboratory research transistor digital computer designed to explore direct-coupled transistor logic (DCTL). The TRADIC Phase One computer was completed in January 1954.

The TRADIC Phase One computer has been claimed to be the world's first fully transistorized computer, ahead of the Mailüfterl in Austria or the Harwell CADET in the UK, which were each completed in 1955. In the UK, the Manchester University Transistor Computer demonstrated a working prototype in 1953 which incorporated transistors before TRADIC was operational, although that was not a fully transistorized computer because it used vacuum tubes to generate the clock signal. The 30 watts of power for the 1 MHz clock in the TRADIC was also supplied by a vacuum tube supply because no transistors were available that could supply that much power at that frequency. If the TRADIC can be called fully transistorized while incorporating vacuum tubes, then the Manchester University Transistor Computer should also be, in which case that is the first transistorized computer and not the TRADIC. If neither can be called fully transistorized, then the CADET was the first fully transistorized computer in February 1955.

Flyable TRADIC also incorporated a single high-power output vacuum-tube amplifier to supply clock power to the system. The designers originally devised a system clock using a crystal-controlled transistor oscillator driving a multitude of transistor amplifiers because each transistor was too low-powered, but since the phase shift of the amplifiers could not be controlled to the required tolerances this had to be abandoned. So by the same criterion of incorporating vacuum tubes the flyable TRADIC was either not a fully transistorized computer, or followed the Manchester University Transistor Computer in 1953. In contrast, the operating requirements for the Flyable TRADIC included performing across a wide temperature range of -55 °C (-67 °F) to +55 °C (+131 °F).

The TRADIC Phase One Computer had 684 Bell Labs Type 1734 Type A cartridge transistors and 10,358 germanium point-contact diodes. The TRADIC was small and light enough to be installed in a B-52 Stratofortress. It was a general-purpose computer. Programs for the TRADIC Phase One Computer were introduced via a removable plugboard, while the Flyable TRADIC used a Mylar sheet with punched holes — a system reminiscent of punched-card storage. TRADIC could perform a million logical operations every second, close to, but not as fast as the vacuum tube computers of the day, using its 1 MHz clock. It operated on less than 100 watts of power and it was much more reliable than its vacuum tube predecessors.
