= Steve Reeves (computer scientist) =

Computer scientist

- Born: 31 October 1957 (age 68); Brighton, England
- Education: University of Birmingham
- Scientific career
- Fields: Computer science, software engineering, formal methods
- Workplaces: University of Waikato, University of Essex, Queen Mary, University of London

Steve Reeves (born 31 October 1957) is a British computer scientist based at the University of Waikato in New Zealand. He has been in the various roles of Associate Dean, Programme Co-ordinator and Head of Department of Software Engineering. He has undertaken research work on the Z notation, formal methods for GUI design, a general theory of refinement and logic for veracity.

Reeves' academic work is in the area of formal methods to aid software engineering. In particular, he has undertaken research into the design and use of logics for specification. With Prof. Martin Henson, he has studied the formal semantics of the Z notation in detail, in relation to the international ISO standard for Z.

He has done work (initially with colleagues from Data61) on uses for blockchain. He has had a two seed grants awarded by the New Zealand Science for Technological Innovation fund SfTI.

More recently, he has developed a logic for veracity, also under the SfTI scheme, but this time as part of a multi-university Spearhead grant Veracity project.

Reeves has delivered talks internationally, including as the opening talk in the BCS-FACS seminar series at the British Computer Society in London in 2005.

Reeves is currently Chair of the (somewhat defunct) Z User Group, and the New Zealand member of the Australasian Software Engineering Conference (ASWEC) Steering Committee and the Asia-Pacific Software Engineering Conference (APSEC), held at Waikato in December 2016 . He is a Fellow of the British Computer Society, a Fellow of the Institute of IT Professionals (formerly the New Zealand Computer Society), and is a Chartered IT Professional (CITPNZ).

Reeves has published a number of academic papers.
