= Shawn Bohner =

American computer scientist

Academic background
- Education: University of Maryland, College Park (BS); Johns Hopkins University (MS); George Mason University (PhD)

Academic work
- Discipline: Computer science
- Institutions: Rose–Hulman Institute of Technology; Colorado Technical University; Virginia Tech

Shawn A. Bohner was an American computer scientist working as a professor of computer science and engineering at the Rose–Hulman Institute of Technology. He was also the co-editor-in-chief of Innovations in Systems and Software Engineering.

== Education ==
Bohner earned a Bachelor of Science degree from the University of Maryland, College Park, a Master of Science from Johns Hopkins University, and a PhD from George Mason University.

== Career ==
Prior to joining the Rose–Hulman Institute of Technology, Bohner was a professor of computer science at Virginia Tech and Colorado Technical University. He was also the director of the National Science Foundation's Center for High Performance Reconfigurable Computing. In 2010, Bohner was a member of the editorial advisory board of the Encyclopedia of Software Engineering.
