= Parliamentary and Scientific Committee =

UK parliamentary group

The UK Parliamentary and Scientific Committee (P&SC) is a United Kingdom parliamentary organization established in 1939. It is an all-party parliamentary group.

== Overview ==
The P&SC provides a forum for scientific and technological issues in the UK. It enables a link between UK parliamentarians, scientific bodies, science-based industry, and academia. The committee informs members of both the UK parliament House of Commons and the House of Lords on matters pertaining to public interest and national policy development.

== Officers ==
The following are officers of the P&SC:

- Chair: George Freeman FRSA MP
- Viscount Stansgate
- Baroness Northover
- Sam Carling MP

== See also ==
- Parliamentary Office of Science and Technology (POST)
- Safety-Critical Systems Club (SCSC)
