= Michael W. Shields =

British computer scientist

Mike Shields
- Born: Michael William Shields; 20 January 1950; England
- Died: 24 September 2023 (aged 73); Malta
- Occupation: Computer scientist
- Known for: F. X. Reid

Academic work
- Institutions: University of Surrey
- Main interests: Theoretical computer science
- Notable works: An Introduction to Automata Theory (1987); Semantics of Parallelism (1997)

Michael ("Mike") William Shields (20 January 1950 – 24 September 2023) was a British computer scientist.

== Overview ==
Mike Shields undertook research on concurrent systems with Peter E. Lauer at the University of Newcastle upon Tyne in the late 1970s. For most of his career, Shields was an academic in the Department of Computing at the University of Surrey in Guildford, southern England. He joined in 1980 and retired in 2006 as a Reader. His research contributions were in theoretical computer science, especially concerning concurrency. In particular, he had written books on automata theory and the semantics of parallel computing.

A meeting was held in 2006 at the British Computer Society's offices in London to celebrate Shields' contribution to computer science (his "innovative and elegant foundational work on models of concurrency") on his retirement. He subsequently moved to Malta in his retirement.

== F. X. Reid ==
F. X. Reid (a.k.a. FXR) was a pen name that Shields sometimes used in his more humorous writings and even within his serious work.

Reid was a long-time contributor to the British Computer Society's FACS Specialist Group FACS FACTS newsletter in the past. For example, he was an enthusiast for the COMEFROM statement and an expert on its semantics. Apparently reports of FXR's death in 2006 were untrue, and his musings continued after this time in the newsletter.

F. X. Reid's most widely known work is "The Song of Hakawatha," a parody of Henry Wadsworth Longfellow's poem The Song of Hiawatha containing references to hacking, Unix and compilers. F. X. Reid has also been mentioned in computer science books.

Reid has been quoted as saying In program proving, only the presence of bugs in one's proof is ascertainable, not their absence, similar to but not the same as a well-known quotation by E. W. Dijkstra about software testing.

== Books ==
Michael W. Shields published a number of books including:

- Shields, Michael W. (1987). An Introduction to Automata Theory. Blackwell Scientific Publications. ISBN 978-0632017560.
- Kwiatkowska, Marta Z.; Shields, Michael W.; Thomas, Richard M., eds. (23–25 July 1990). Semantics for Concurrency: Proceedings of the International BCS-FACS Workshop. Workshops in Computing. Springer. ISBN 978-3540196259.
- Shields, Michael W. (1997). Semantics of Parallelism: Non-interleaving representation of behaviour. Springer. ISBN 978-3540760597.
