= Martin Henson (photographer) =

English photographer

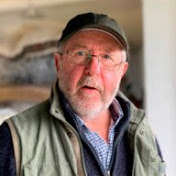
- Born: 1952 (age 73–74); Adel, Leeds, England
- Known for: Photography
- Website: martinhensonphotography.co.uk

Martin Henson (born 1952) is an English landscape photographer, best known for his black and white pinhole images. He specializes in black and white landscapes.

== Early life ==
Martin was born to parents Betty and Stephen. At the age of 12, Martin's passion for photography began. Martin Henson's first camera was bought for him when he was 12 years old. It was a Kodak 120 roll film.
