= Formal Aspects of Computing =

Academic computer science journal

- Discipline: Computer science, formal methods
- Language: English
- Edited by: Cliff Jones (1989−2007); Jim Woodcock (2007–2025); Einar Broch Johnsen & Maurice ter Beek (2025–present)

Publication details
- History: 1989–present
- Publisher: Association for Computing Machinery (United States)
- Frequency: Quarterly
- Open access: Gold
- Impact factor: 1.4 (2024)

Standard abbreviations
- ISO 4: Form. Asp. Comput.

Indexing
- ISSN: 0934-5043 (print); 1433-299X (web)
- OCLC no.: 42939863

Links
- Journal homepage

Formal Aspects of Computing (FAC) is a peer-reviewed Gold Open Access journal published by Association for Computing Machinery (ACM) and the BCS (British Computer Society, the Chartered Institute for IT). The journal has been and is closely associated with the BCS-FACS Specialist Group on Formal Aspects of Computing Science and Formal Methods Europe.

== Origins ==
A comment from Christopher Strachey inspired the journal:

"Much of the practical work done in computing, both in software and hardware design, could be better because the people who do it need to understand the fundamental design principles of their work clearly. Most abstract mathematical and theoretical work is sterile because it has no point of contact with real computing."

Strachey called for an end to the artificial and injurious separation of practical and theoretical work in programming.

== History ==
Formal Aspects of Computing was founded in 1989 by the BCS in an initiative led by John Cooke, Dan Simpson, and Cliff Jones, all of whom were members of the BCS Formal Aspects of Computing Specialist Group. Cliff Jones was the founding editor, and Springer was the initial publisher. Cliff Jones was editor-in-chief from 1989 to 2007. Jim Woodcock took over as editor-in-chief in 2007. Since 2025, Einar Broch Johnsen and Maurice ter Beek are joint editors-in-chief.

Until the end of 2021, the journal was published by Springer in association with the BCS Academy of Computing. From 2022, it has been published by the Association for Computing Machinery.

== Research contributions ==
Formal Aspects of Computing publishes contributions at the junction of theory and practice. The principal aim of FAC is to promote the growth of computing science, show its relation to practice, and stimulate applications of appropriate formalisms to practical problems. One significant challenge is to show how a range of formal models can be related to each other. In particular, the scope of Formal Aspects of Computing includes:

- Well-founded notations for the description and specification of systems.
- Methods for verifiable system design.
- Elucidation of fundamental computational concepts and models.
- Approaches to fault-tolerant design.
- Verification tools and theorem proving.
- State-exploration tools and model checking.
- Formal semantics for widely used notations and methods.
- Formal approaches to requirements analysis.

Other contributions

In addition to research papers, the journal includes other contributions such as:

- Special issues: Proposals for special issues from leading members of the formal methods community. Appropriate proposals include:
  - Conferences and workshops: Revised collections of papers.
  - Thematic topics: Collections of papers dedicated to hot topics in formal methods, usually with an open call for papers.
- State-of-the-art reports: In-depth, scholarly analyses of essential research areas.
- History of ideas The history of ideas traces the origin and development of formal methods and their tools.
- Book reviews: Critical reviews of formal methods research monographs and teaching textbooks.
- Obituaries: Obituaries usually describe and celebrate the lives of the most successful researchers through seminal contributions to formal methods.

== Indexing ==
The journal is indexed by the ACM Digital Library, DBLP, EBSCO, Google Scholar, INSPEC, OOIR, ProQuest, SCISPACE, Scilit, Scimago, and SCOPUS, among others.

According to the Journal Citation Reports, the journal has a 2024 impact factor of 1.4.

== See also ==
- Acta Informatica
- Innovations in Systems and Software Engineering
