= Centre for Software Reliability =

English research centre

Coordinates: 54.980°N 1.616°W

The Centre for Software Reliability (CSR) is a distributed British organisation concerned with software reliability, including safety-critical issues. It was was founded in 1983, it consists of two independent sister organisations based at the Schools of Science & Technology at Newcastle University, UK. and City St George's, University of London.

The Club runs a number of events each year, including the annual Safety-Critical Systems Symposium (SSS). Until August 2016, it ran the Safety-Critical Systems Club (SCSC) and the Software Reliability & Metrics Club. Since then, the Safety-Critical Systems Club has been run by the department of Computer Science at the University of York.

About half of CSR's support is from the Engineering and Physical Science Research Council (EPSRC).

CSR members:

- Prof. Tom Anderson
