= Innovations in Systems and Software Engineering =

- Discipline: Systems and software engineering
- Language: English
- Edited by: Michael G. Hinchey, Shawn Bohner

Publication details
- History: 2005–present
- Publisher: Springer Science+Business Media on behalf of NASA
- Frequency: Quarterly
- Open access: Hybrid

Standard abbreviations
- ISO 4: Innov. Syst. Softw. Eng.

Indexing
- ISSN: 1614-5046 (print); 1614-5054 (web)
- LCCN: 2007222334
- OCLC no.: 440749737

Links
- Journal homepage; Online access

Innovations in Systems and Software Engineering: A NASA Journal is a peer-reviewed scientific journal of computer science covering systems and software engineering, including formal methods. It is published by Springer Science+Business Media on behalf of NASA. The editors-in-chief are Michael Hinchey (University of Limerick) and Shawn Bohner (Rose-Hulman Institute of Technology).

== Abstracting and indexing ==
The journal is abstracted and indexed in:

- Academic OneFile
- DBLP
- EI-Compendex
- Inspec
- ProQuest databases
- Scopus
- VINITI Database RAS
