= J. Anthony Hall =

British software engineer

J. Anthony Hall is a British software engineer specializing in the use of formal methods, especially the Z notation.

Anthony Hall was educated at the University of Oxford with a BA in chemistry and a DPhil in theoretical chemistry. His subsequent posts have included:

- ICI Research Fellow, Department of Theoretical Chemistry, University of Sheffield (1971–1973)
- Principal Scientific Officer, British Museum Research Laboratory (1973–1980)
- Senior Consultant, Systems Programming Limited (1980–1984)
- Principal Consultant, Systems Designers (1984–1986)
- Visiting Professor, Carnegie Mellon University (1994)
- Principal Consultant, Praxis Critical Systems (1986–2004)

In particular, Hall has worked on software development using formal methods for the UK National Air Traffic Services (NATS). He has been an invited speaker at conferences concerned with formal methods, requirements engineering and software engineering.

Since 2004, Hall has been an independent consultant. He has also been a visiting professor at the University of York. Hall was the founding chair of ForTIA, the Formal Techniques Industry Association.

== Selected publications ==
- Anthony Hall, Seven Myths of Formal Methods, IEEE Software, September 1990, pp. 11–19.
- Anthony Hall and Roderick Chapman, Correctness by Construction: Developing a Commercial Secure System, IEEE Software, January/February 2002, pp. 18–25.
