= Jawed Siddiqi =

Pakistani British computer scientist and software engineer

Jawed Siddqi
- Born: Karachi, Pakistan
- Education: University of London
- Known for: Computer Science
- Scientific career
- Fields: Software Engineering; Informatics; Dispute Resolution
- Workplaces: Sheffield Hallam University; Oxford University Computing Laboratory
- Doctoral advisor: Bryan Ratcliff
- Other academic advisors: Joseph Goguen

Jawed Siddiqi FBCS is a Pakistani British computer scientist and software engineer. He is professor emeritus of software engineering at Sheffield Hallam University, England. He is the president of NCUP National Council of University Professors in the UK.

== Education and academic career ==
Siddiqi received a BSc degree in mathematics from the University of London, followed by an MSc and PhD in computer science at the University of Aston, Birmingham. During 1991–1993, he was a visiting researcher at the Centre for Requirements and Foundation at the Oxford University Computing Laboratory (now the Oxford University Department of Computer Science), working with Professor Joseph Goguen in the area of requirements engineering. Siddiqi has been involved with the BCS Formal Aspects of Computing Science (FACS) Specialist Group for many years. Currently he is chair of the group. Siddiqi is also an executive member of the IEEE Technical Council on Software Engineering (TCSE). Siddiqi is a fellow of the British Computer Society, a member of the IEEE, and a member of the ACM. He is a co-editor of Formal Methods: State of the Art and New Directions.

== Fighting racism ==
Siddiqi has for three decades has been involved in countering racism and fighting for social justice. He was a founding member and chair of the North Staffordshire Racial Equality Council, executive member of the West Midlands Regional Board for Commission for Racial Equality, secretary of the Black Justice Project and chair of Sheffield Racial Harassment Project. He has written about and been invited to speak on countering racism particularly structural racism. He is the vice chair of The Monitoring Group (TMG). TMG works with all sections of the black and Asian communities to that are facing hostility, abuse and violence from racists. It has been involved in several high-profile cases: the Stephen Lawrence family, Sarfraz Najeib family and Zahid Mubarek family.

== Public service ==
Siddiqi was an active member, an elected officer and an experienced case worker for his trade union the University and College Union (UCU). He has been involved in a number of cases acting as a union representative or advocate for individuals against various public and private sector organisations. In April 2006, Siddiqi successfully defended Professor Richard Bornat of Middlesex University in a hearing concerning his suspension due to controversial emails. Siddiqi has a strong interest in mediation, arbitration and conflict resolution and in various fields but particularly higher education and information technology and is a member of Improving Dispute Resolution Advisory Service (IDRAS) for Higher and Further Education, UK. He has completed training with the Chartered Institute of Arbitrators entitling him to be an Associate of the Institute.

== See also ==
List of British Pakistanis
