= Safety-Critical Systems Club =

UK professional association

- Abbreviation: SCSC
- Established: 1991; 35 years ago
- Legal status: CIC
- Purpose: Education, Professional community
- Members: 1,348
- Affiliations: List: SARS BCS IET
- Website: scsc.uk

The Safety-Critical Systems Club (SCSC) is a professional association in the United Kingdom. It aims to share knowledge about safety-critical systems, including current and emerging practices in safety engineering, software engineering, and product and process safety standards.

== Activities ==
Since it started in 1991, the Club has met its objectives by holding regular one- and two- day seminars, publishing a newsletter three times per year, and running an annual conference – the Safety-critical Systems Symposium (SSS), for which it publishes proceedings. In performing these functions, and in adding tutorials to its programme, the Club has been instrumental in helping to define the requirements for education and training in the safety-critical systems domain.

The SCSC also implements initiatives to improve professionalism in the field of safety-critical systems engineering, and organises various working groups to develop and maintain industry-standard guidance. Notable outputs of these groups include the Data Safety Guidance, Service Assurance Guidance and Safety Assurance Objectives for Autonomous Systems, which have been adopted by UK government organisations such as the NHS, Dstl and the Ministry of Defence; and the Goal Structuring Notation (GSN) community standard, which has influenced the development of the OMG's Structured Assurance Case Metamodel standard.

== History ==
The Safety-Critical Systems Club formally commenced operation on 1 May 1991 as the result of a contract placed by the UK Department of Trade and Industry (DTI) and the Science and Engineering Research Council (SERC). A report to the UK Parliamentary and Scientific Committee on the science of safety-critical systems led to the 'SafeIT' programme, which recommended formation of the Club. As part of their safety-critical systems research programme, the DTI and SERC awarded a three-year contract for organising and running the Safety-Critical Systems Club to the Institution of Electrical Engineers, the British Computer Society, and the University of Newcastle upon Tyne, the last of these to implement the organisation. The SCSC became self-sufficient in 1994, based at Newcastle University through the Centre for Software Reliability. Activities included detailed technical work, such as planning and organising events and editing the SCSC newsletter and other publications. From the start, the UK Health and Safety Executive was an active supporter of the Club, and, along with all the other organisations already mentioned, remains so.

It was intended that the Club should include in its ambit both technical and managerial personnel, and that it should facilitate communication among all sections of the safety-critical systems community.

The inaugural seminar, intended to introduce the Club to the safety-critical systems community, took place at UMIST, Manchester, on 11 July 1991 and attracted 256 delegates. The need for such an organisation was perceived by many in the software-engineering and safety-critical systems communities.

Management of the SCSC moved to the University of York in 2016. In 2020 it became an independent community interest company.

== See also ==
- Centre for Software Reliability
