= Abbey College, Malvern =

Abbey College

Location
- 253 Wells Road; Malvern, Worcestershire, WR14 4JF; England; 52.0725°N 2.3329°W

Information
- Type: Independent, residential tutorial college
- Established: 1979; 47 years ago
- Founder: Mohammed Ali Kaveh
- Principal: Daniel Booker
- Staff: 20 (Full Time); 20 (Part time)
- Age: 14 to 20
- Enrolment: c. 100
- Campus size: 70 acres (28 ha)
- Website: www.abbeycollege.co.uk

Abbey College in Malvern, Worcestershire, England, is a small boarding school providing secondary education to a diverse and international student body. The present college was founded in 1979 by Mohammed Ali Kaveh and has been run by members of his family ever since. Originally named Abbey International College, it was later shortened to Abbey College. The site has been used for education since 1874. The Abbey School (a girls' boarding school) occupied the premises between 1908 and 1979.

Following Mohammed Ali Kaveh’s death in 1986, the college passed to his widow, Manzar Banoo Shafie, and from 2008 to 2013 it was owned by their son, Hekmat Kaveh. In 2013 the present operating company, Abbey College in Malvern Limited, was incorporated. Hekmat Kaveh has been a director of the company since its incorporation, and since 2023 its majority stakeholder.

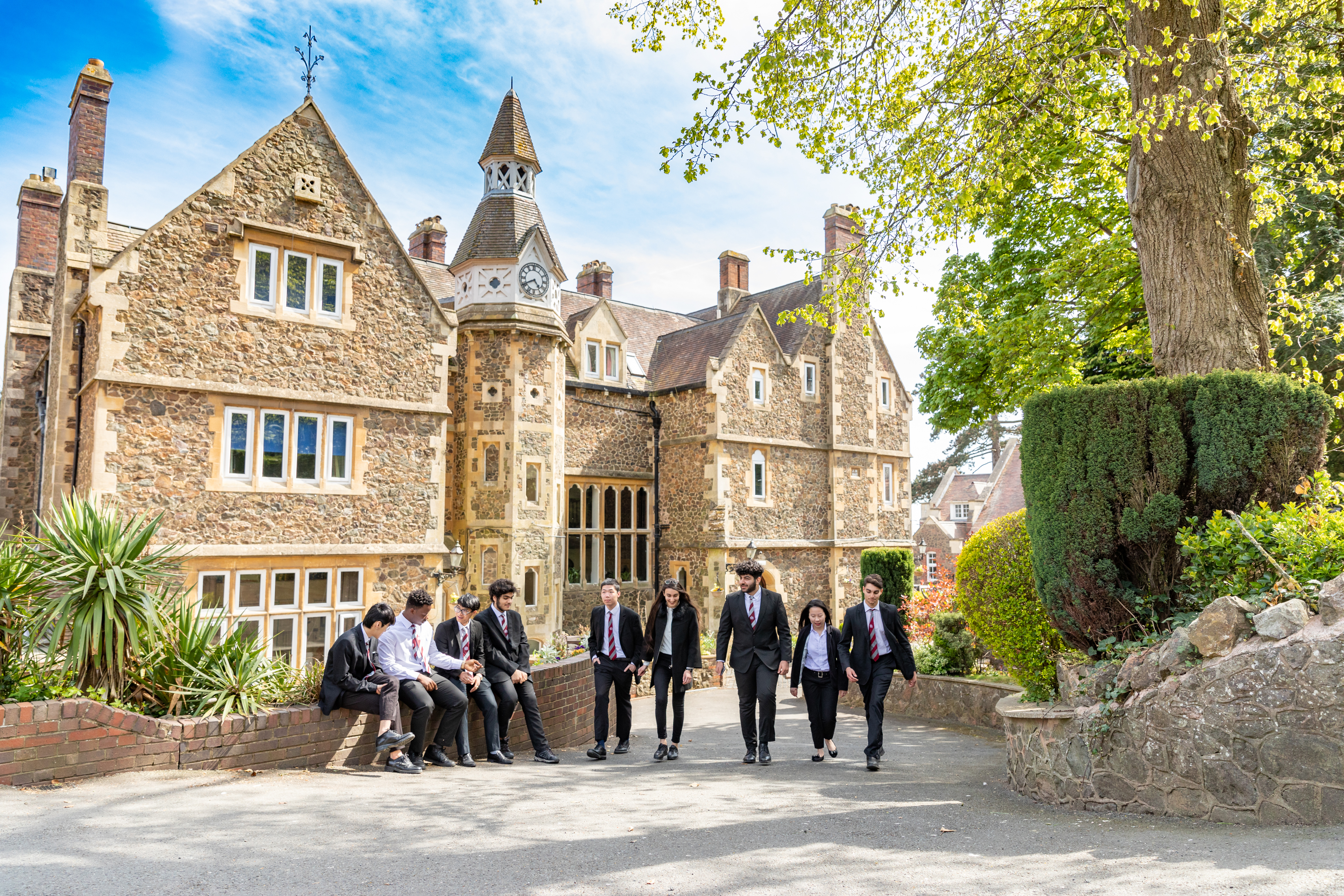
Abbey College

The school sits on a 70 acres (28 ha) campus alongside the Malvern Hills between Great Malvern and Malvern Wells. It is co-educational with 33 students on its roll in 2024, and specialises in secondary and pre-university education and English as a second or foreign language (ESOL).

In 2020, Daniel Booker was installed as the college's new principal.

The college offers academic courses including GCSE, IGCSE, A level and foundation courses, as well as short courses and high school experience courses. It runs vacation courses for groups and individuals throughout the Summer. Abbey College also has a centre in Prague which offers pathway programmes for medical studies, with routes into universities across Europe. Abbey College Prague provides preparation courses (delivered in English), in cooperation with Charles University's Institute for Language and Preparatory Studies in Prague which are designed for international students interested in careers in medicine or dentistry.

In January 2014, Abbey College was fined £24,000 after pleading guilty to breaches of Fire Regulations.
