= Heinz Zemanek =

Austrian computer pioneer

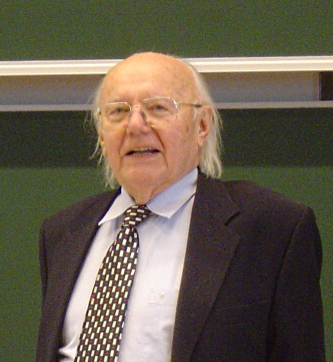
- Heinz Zemanek in 2007
- Born: 1 January 1920; Vienna, Austria
- Died: 16 July 2014 (aged 94); Vienna, Austria
- Education: Vienna University of Technology
- Known for: Mailüfterl, PL/I
- Awards: Austrian Cross of Honour for Science and Art, 1st class (2005)
- Scientific career
- Fields: Computer Scientist
- Workplaces: Vienna University of Technology, IBM

Heinz Zemanek (actually Heinrich Josef Zemanek) (1 January 1920 – 16 July 2014) was an Austrian computer pioneer who led the development, from 1954 to 1958, of one of the first complete transistorised computers on the European continent. The computer was nicknamed Mailüfterl — Viennese for "May breeze" — in reference to Whirlwind, a computer developed at MIT between 1945 and 1951.

== Life ==
Heinz Zemanek went to a secondary school in Vienna and earned his Matura in 1937. He then started to study at the University of Vienna. In 1940, Zemanek was drafted into the Wehrmacht, where he served in a "communication unit" and also as a teacher in an Intelligence Service School. Returning to studying radar technology he earned his Diplom in 1944 with the help of University of Stuttgart professor Richard Feldtkeller (1901–1981).

After the war Zemanek worked as an assistant at the university and earned his PhD in 1951 about timesharing methods in multiplex telegraphy. In 1952 he completed the URR1 (Universal Relais Rechner 1, i.e., Universal Relay Computer 1). He died at the age of 94 on 16 July 2014.

== The Vienna Lab ==
The IBM Laboratory Vienna, also known as the Vienna Lab, was founded in 1961 as a department of the IBM Laboratory in Böblingen, Germany, with Professor Zemanek as its first manager. Zemanek remained with the Vienna Lab until 1976, when he was appointed an IBM Fellow. He was crucial in the creation of the formal definition of the programming language PL/I.

For several years, Zemanek had been a lecturer at the Vienna University of Technology, which features a lecture hall named in his honor. He was also a long-time member of the International Federation for Information Processing, of which he was president from 1971 to 1974.

== Scouting ==
Professor Zemanek joined the Boy Scouts in 1932 and served as Scout Leader, International Secretary of Austria from 1946 to 1949 and International Commissioner of the Pfadfinder Österreichs from 1949 to 1954.

== Honours and awards ==
- Austrian Cross of Honour for Science and Art, 1st class (2005)
- Gold Decoration for Services to the City of Vienna
- Joseph Johann Ritter von Prechtl Medal from the Technical University of Vienna
- Leonardo da Vinci Medal of the European Society for the Education of Engineers
- Wilhelm Exner Medal (1972).
- Rudolf Kompfner Medal of the Faculty of Electrical Engineering and Information Technology at the Technical University of Vienna (2010)
- Member of the European Academy of Sciences and Arts
- Hero of Uzbekistan
- Eduard Rhein Ring of Honor (Eduard Rhein Foundation, 1998)
- Heinz-Zemanek-Preis, an award for extraordinary accomplishments in the field of computer science, was named for him
- Kardinal-Innitzer-Preis (2003) – for his lifetime accomplishments

== Literature ==
- Bekanntes & Unbekanntes aus der Kalenderwissenschaft. Munich: Oldenbourg, 1978
- Kalender und Chronologie. Munich: Oldenbourg, 1990
- Weltmacht Computer. Esslingen: Bechtle, 1991
- Das geistige Umfeld der Informationstechnik. Berlin: Springer, 1992
- Unser Kalender. Vienna: Wiener Kath. Akad., 1995
- Vom Mailüfterl zum Internet. Vienna: Picus-Verlag, 2001
- Anekdoten zur Informatik. Innsbruck: Studien-Verlag, 2001

== See also ==
- List of pioneers in computer science
