= Cliff Jones (computer scientist) =

British computer scientist (born 1944)

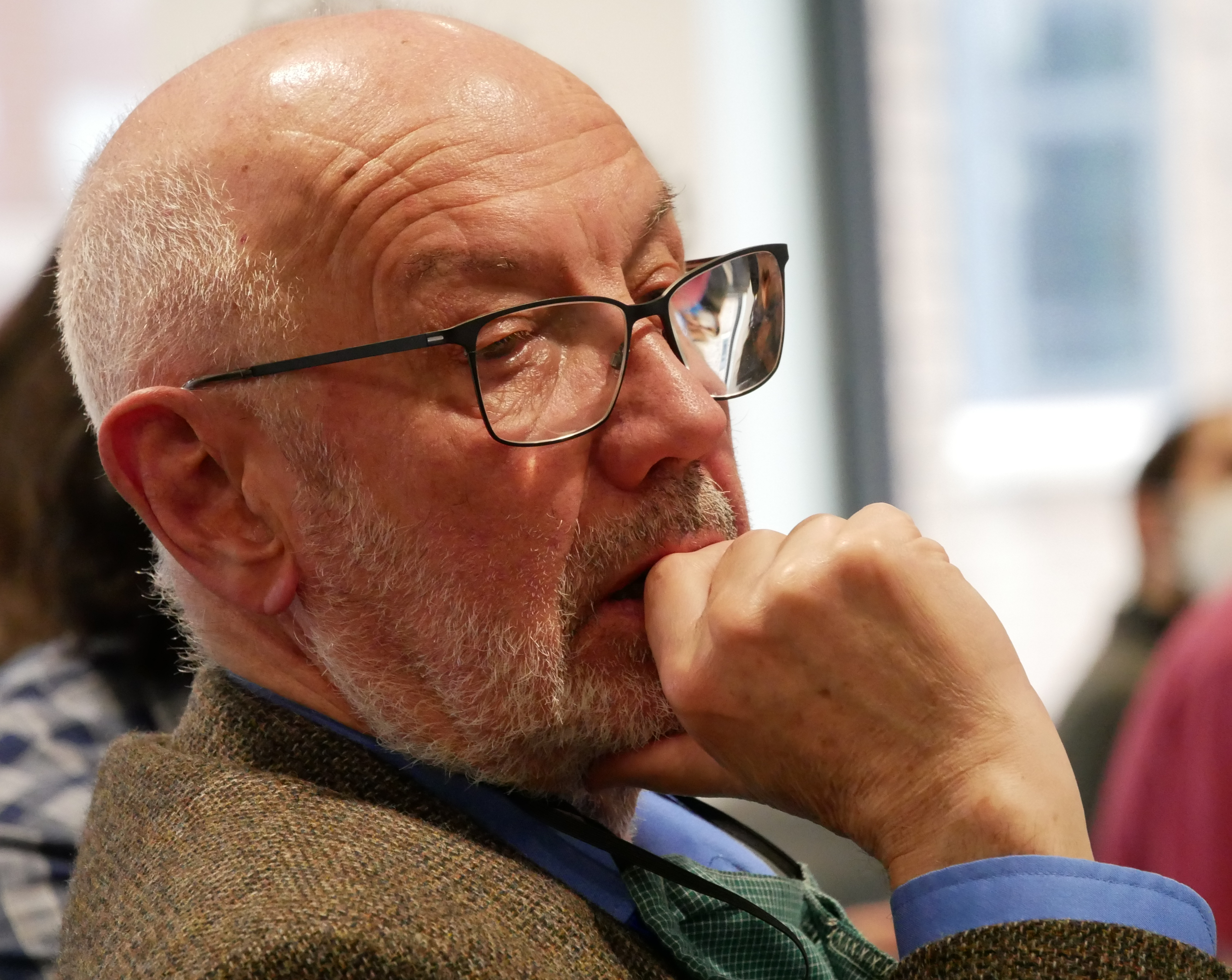
- Cliff Jones in Swansea
- Born: 1 June 1944 (age 82)
- Citizenship: British
- Education: (DPhil) University of Oxford
- Known for: Vienna Development Method
- Scientific career
- Fields: Computer Science
- Workplaces: IBM Laboratory Vienna; Victoria University of Manchester; Newcastle University
- Thesis: Development Methods for Computer Programs Including a Notion of Interference
- Doctoral advisor: C. A. R. Hoare
- Doctoral students: John Fitzgerald; Tobias Nipkow

Clifford "Cliff" B. Jones FREng (born 1 June 1944) is a British computer scientist, specializing in research into formal methods. He completed his DPhil at the Oxford University Computing Laboratory (now the Oxford University Department of Computer Science) under Tony Hoare, awarded in 1981. Jones' thesis proposed an extension to Hoare logic for handling concurrent programs, rely/guarantee.

Prior to his DPhil, Jones worked for IBM, between the Hursley and Vienna Laboratories. In Vienna, Jones worked with Peter Lucas, Dines Bjørner and others on the Vienna Development Method (VDM), originally as a method for specifying the formal semantics of programming languages, and subsequently for specifying and verifying programs.

Cliff Jones was a professor at the Victoria University of Manchester in the 1980s and early 1990s, worked in industry at Harlequin for a period, and is now a Professor of Computing Science at Newcastle University. He has been editor-in-chief of the Formal Aspects of Computing journal.

As well as formal methods, Jones also has interests in interdisciplinary aspects of computer science and the history of computer science.

== Books ==
Jones has authored and edited many books, including:

- Jones, Cliff B.; Misra, Jayadev, eds. (2021). Theories of Programming: The Life and Works of Tony Hoare. ACM Books. Vol. 39. New York, NY: Association for Computing Machinery. doi:10.1145/3477355. ISBN 978-1-4503-8728-6. S2CID 238251696.
- Understanding Programming Languages, Jones, C.B. Springer, Cham. Print ISBN 978-3-030-59256-1 / online ISBN 978-3-030-59257-8 (2020).
- Reflections on the Work of C.A.R. Hoare, Roscoe, A.W., Jones, C.B. and Wood, K. (eds.). Springer. ISBN 978-1-84882-911-4 (2010).
- VDM: Une methode rigoureuse pour le development du logiciel, Jones, C.B. Masson, Paris. ISBN 2-225-82812-1 (1993).
- MURAL: A Formal Development Support System, Jones, C.B., Jones, K.D., Lindsay, P.A. and Moore, R. (eds.). Springer-Verlag. ISBN 3-540-19651-X (1991).
- Systematic Software Development using VDM (2nd Edition), Jones, C.B. Prentice Hall International Series in Computer Science, Prentice Hall. ISBN 0-13-880733-7, 1990
- Case Studies in Systematic Software Development, Jones, C.B. and Shaw, R.C.F. (eds.). Prentice Hall International Series in Computer Science, Prentice Hall. ISBN 0-13-116088-5 (1989).
- Essays in Computing Science, Hoare, C.A.R. and Jones, C.B. Prentice Hall International Series in Computer Science, Prentice Hall. ISBN 0-13-284027-8 (1989).
- Systematic Software Development using VDM, Jones, C.B. Prentice Hall International Series in Computer Science, Prentice Hall. ISBN 0-13-880717-5 (1986).
- Programming Languages and their Definition: Selected Papers of Hans Bekic (1936–1982), Jones, C.B. (editor). Lecture Notes in Computer Science, Volume 177, Springer-Verlag. ISBN 3-540-13378-X (1984).
- Formal Specification and Software Development, Bjørner, D. and Jones, C.B. Prentice Hall International Series in Computer Science, Prentice Hall. ISBN 0-13-329003-4 (1982).
- Software Development: A Rigorous Approach, Jones, C.B. Prentice Hall International Series in Computer Science, Prentice Hall. ISBN 0-13-821884-6 (1980).
- The Vienna Development Method: The Meta-Language, Bjørner, D. and Jones, C.B. (editors). Lecture Notes in Computer Science, Volume 61, Springer-Verlag. ISBN 3-540-08766-4 (1978).
