= Integrated Project Support Environment =

The Integrated Project Support Environment (IPSE) is a set of management and technical tools to support software development, usually integrated in a coherent framework, equivalent to a Software Engineering Environment.

Influential IPSE research was done in the IPSE2.5 project, part of the Alvey programme. The name IPSE2.5 is due directly to the identification in the Alvey programme of three generations of IPSEs. The IPSE2.5 project lay somewhere between the second generation (characterised by the use of databases to support the core) and the third generation (characterised by the use of expert systems techniques). IPSE2.5 is credited with defining early versions of the Role and Interaction concepts later used in human interaction management.
