= Michael Hinchey =

Irish computer scientist

Michael G. Hinchey
- Born: 1969 (age 56–57); Limerick, Ireland
- Citizenship: Ireland, USA
- Education: University of Limerick, Wolfson College, Oxford, St John's College, Cambridge
- Known for: Formal methods, Vice-President of IFIP
- Scientific career
- Fields: Computer science
- Workplaces: University of Nebraska–Lincoln, Queen's University Belfast, New Jersey Institute of Technology, University of Skövde, Loyola College in Maryland, University of Queensland, Virginia Tech, NASA Goddard Space Flight Center University of Limerick

Michael Gerard Hinchey (born 1969) is an Irish computer scientist and former Director of the Irish Software Engineering Research Centre (Lero), a multi-university research centre headquartered at the University of Limerick, Ireland. He now serves as Head of Department of the Department of Computer Science & Information Systems at University of Limerick.

Mike Hinchey studied at the University of Limerick as an undergraduate (was the leading student in his graduating year), Oxford University (at Wolfson College) for his MSc and Cambridge University (at St John's College) for his PhD.

Hinchey has been a promulgator of formal methods throughout his career, especially CSP and the Z notation. He was Director of the NASA Software Engineering Laboratory at NASA Goddard Space Flight Center and is the founding editor-in-chief of the NASA journal Innovations in Systems and Software Engineering, launched in 2005.

He has held many academic positions, both visiting and permanent, at a number of universities including the University of Nebraska–Lincoln, Queen's University Belfast, New Jersey Institute of Technology, Hiroshima University the University of Skövde in Sweden and was at Loyola College in Maryland (now Loyola University Maryland), United States, before his current post.

Hinchey is a Member of Academia Europaea, a Fellow of the IET, a Fellow of the IMA, and a Senior Member of the IEEE. He is a Chartered Engineer, Chartered Professional Engineer, Chartered Mathematician and Chartered IT Professional.

As of 2016, Hinchey has been serving as President of IFIP (International Federation for Information Processing).

== Selected publications ==
- Hinchey, M.G. and Bowen, J.P., editors, Applications of Formal Methods. Prentice Hall International Series in Computer Science, 1995. ISBN 0-13-366949-1.
- Dean, C.N. and Hinchey, M.G., editors, Teaching and Learning Formal Methods, Academic Press, London, 1996. ISBN 0-12-349040-5.
- Bowen, J.P. and Hinchey, M.G., editors, High-Integrity System Specification and Design. Springer-Verlag, London, FACIT series, 1999. ISBN 3-540-76226-4.
- Hinchey, M.G. and Bowen, J.P., editors, Industrial-Strength Formal Methods in Practice. Springer-Verlag, London, FACIT series, 1999. ISBN 1-85233-640-4.
