= Mailüfterl =

Early computer from Austria

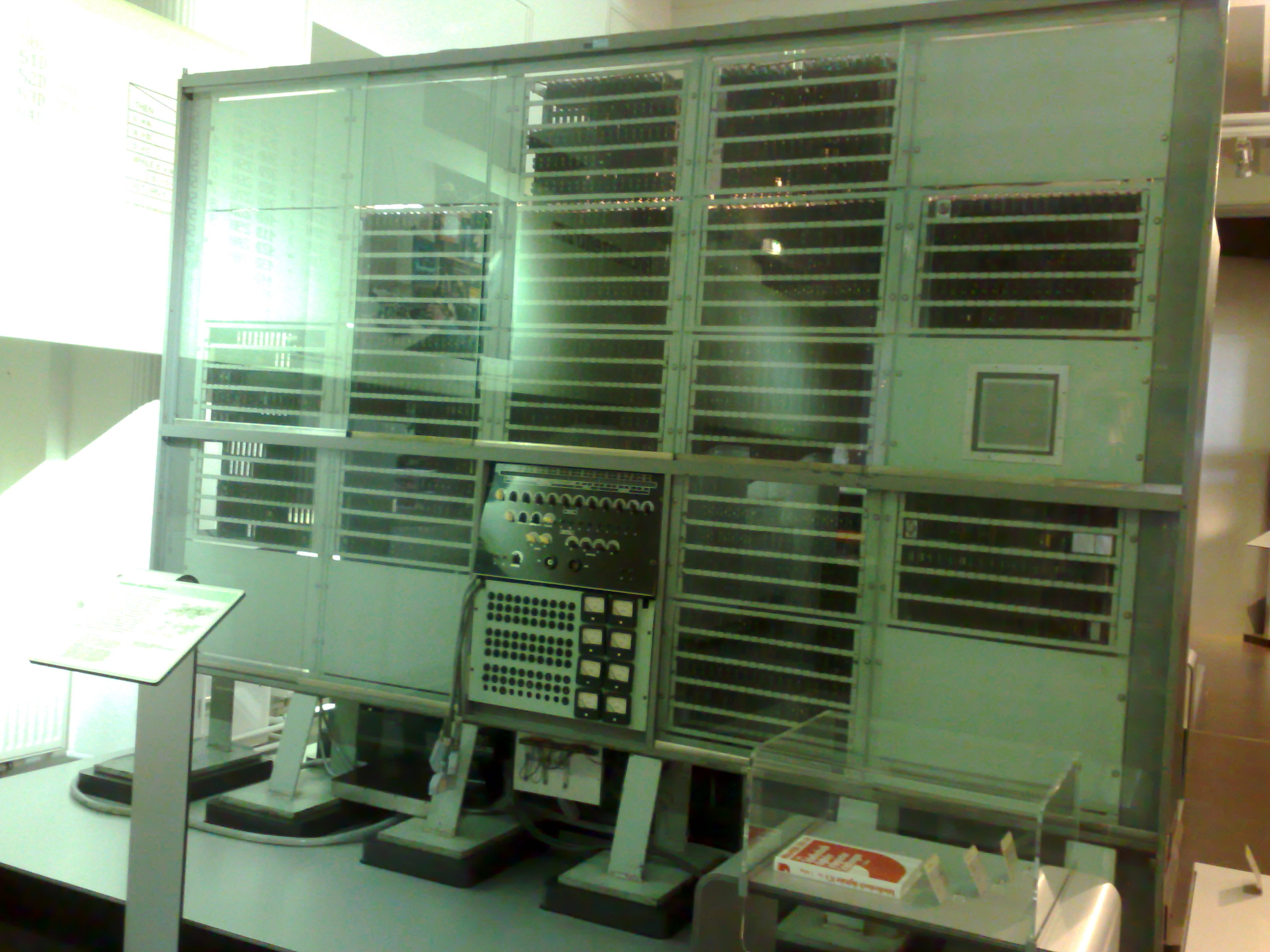
Today the Mailüfterl is in the Technisches Museum Wien.

Mailüfterl is a nickname for the Austrian Binär dezimaler Volltransistor-Rechenautomat (binary-decimal fully transistorized computing automaton), an early transistorized computer. Other early transistorized computers included TRADIC, Harwell CADET and TX-0.

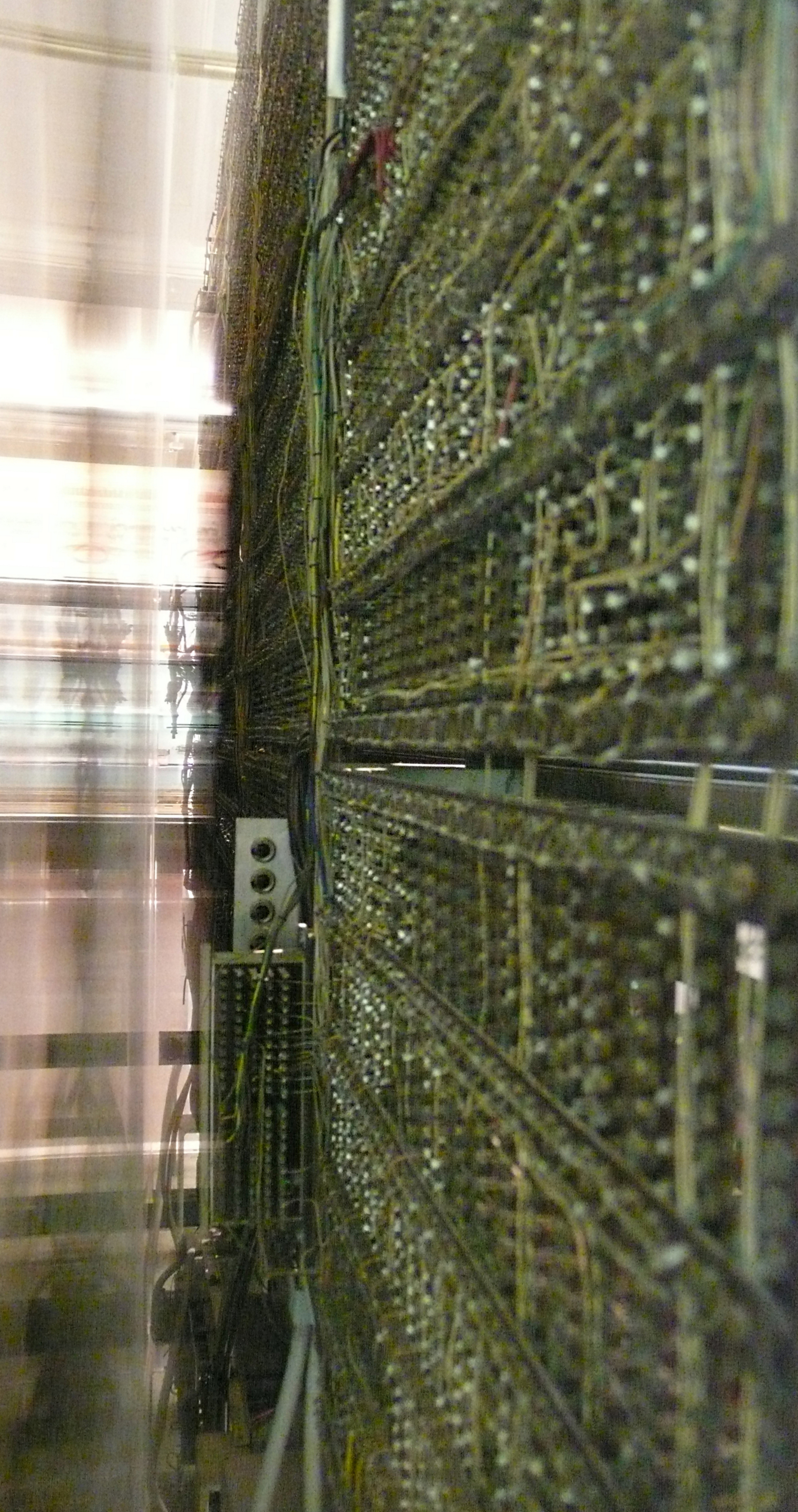
Mailüfterl wire side

Mailüfterl was built from May 1956 to May 1958 at the Vienna University of Technology by Heinz Zemanek.

Heinz Zemanek had come to an agreement with Konrad Zuse, whose company Zuse KG would finance the work of Rudolf Bodo, who helped build the Mailüfterl, also that all circuit diagrams of the Z22 were supplied to Bodo and Zemanek, and that after the Mailüfterl project Bodo should work for the Zuse KG to help build the transistorized Z23.

The first program, computation of the prime 5,073,548,261, was executed in May 1958. Completion of the software continued until 1961. The nickname was coined by Zemanek: "Even if it cannot match the rapid calculation speed of American models called 'Whirlwind' or 'Typhoon', it will be enough for a 'Wiener Mailüfterl'" (Viennese May breeze).

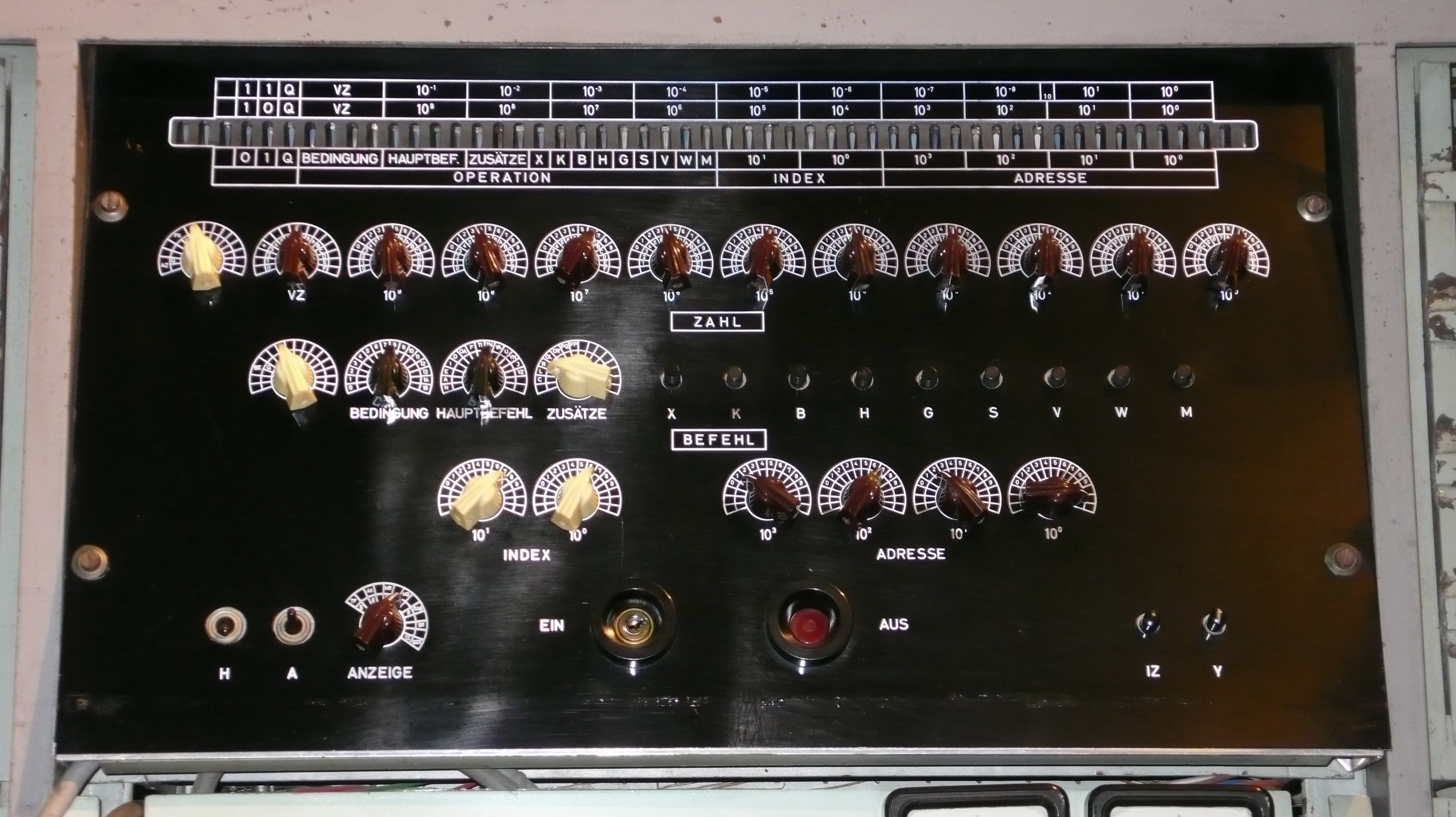
Mailüfterl Control Unit

The computer has 3,000 transistors, 5,000 diodes, 1,000 assembly platelets, 100,000 solder joints, 15,000 resistors, 5,000 capacitors and about 20,000 metres (66,000 ft) of wire. It is 4 meters (13 ft) wide, 2.5 meters (8.2 ft) high, and 50 centimeters (20 in) deep. The machine was comparable in calculating power to what were then considered small vacuum-tube computers. Calculations and representation of values worked using the BCD system.

Zemanek later said about his project that it was a "semi-illegal" undertaking of an assistant professor, which he and a group of students realized without official authorization, and hence without financial support, from the university. In 1954 he traveled to Philips in the Netherlands, where he asked for a donation in kind. Transistors, invented seven years before and just beginning to be available commercially, were very difficult to obtain in quantity at any price, but Zemanek received a commitment for 1,000 rather slow hearing-aid transistors, and Philips finally shipped a total of 4,000 high-quality transistors to the Austrians.

== See also ==
- List of transistorized computers
