= Formal Methods Europe =

Software research and information organisation

Formal Methods Europe (FME) is an organization whose aim is to encourage the research and application of formal methods for the improvement of software and hardware in computer-based systems. The association's members are drawn from academia and industry. It is based in Europe, but is international in scope. FME operates under Dutch law.

Activities include or have included:

- Dissemination of research findings and industrial experience through conferences (every 18 months) and sponsored events;
- Development of information resources for educators;
- Networking for commercial practitioners through ForTIA (Formal Techniques Industry Association).

The Chair of FME is John Fitzgerald of the University of Newcastle upon Tyne, UK.

== ForTIA ==
The Formal Techniques Industry Association (ForTIA) aimed to support the industrial use of formal methods under the umbrella organization of Formal Methods Europe. It was founded in 2003 through the initial efforts of Dines Bjørner and was chaired by Anthony Hall and Volkmar Lotz among others. Its scope was international and membership was by company. It organized meetings, especially in conjunction with conferences, for instance, industry days at the FM conferences organized by FME.

== See also ==
- BCS-FACS Formal Aspects of Computing Science Specialist Group
- Formal methods
- Anthony Hall, founding chair of ForTIA
