= Zhiming Liu (computer scientist) =

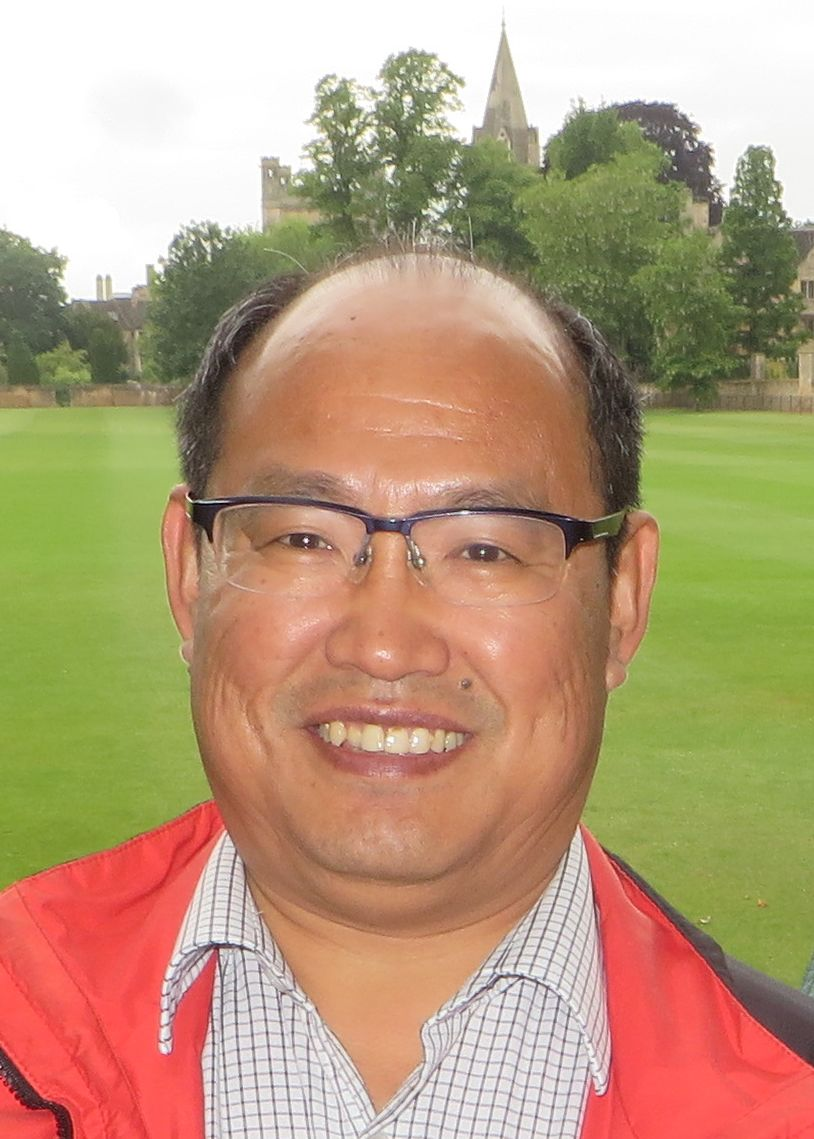
- Prof. Zhiming Liu in Oxford, England, 2015.
- Born: 10 October 1961 (age 65); Hebei, China
- Citizenship: British
- Education: Luoyang, Chinese Academy of Sciences, University of Warwick
- Known for: rCOS
- Scientific career
- Workplaces: University of Leicester, UNU-IIST, Birmingham City University, Southwest University
- Doctoral advisor: Mathai Joseph

Zhiming Liu (Chinese: 刘志明, born 10 October 1961, Hebei, China) is a computer scientist. He studied mathematics in Luoyang, Henan, China, and obtained his first degree in 1982. He holds a master's degree in Computer Science from the Institute of Software of the Chinese Academy of Sciences (1988), and a PhD degree from the University of Warwick (1991). His PhD thesis was on Fault-Tolerant Programming by Transformations.

== Career ==
After his PhD, Zhiming Liu worked as a guest scientist at the Department of Computer Science, Technical University of Denmark, Lyngby in 1991–1992. Then he returned to the University of Warwick and worked as a postdoctoral research fellow on formal techniques in real-time and fault-tolerant systems till October 1994, when he became a university lecturer in computer science at the University of Leicester (UK). He worked at UNU-IIST during 2002–2013 at UNU-IIST as a research fellow and senior research fellow. He joined Birmingham City University (UK) in October 2013 as Professor of Software Engineering. In 2016, he moved to a new professorial post at Southwest University in Chongqing, China, with funding through the Thousand Talents Program.

== Research contributions ==
Zhiming Liu's main research interest is in the areas of formal methods of computer systems design, including real-time systems, fault-tolerant systems, object-oriented and component-based systems. His research results have been published in mainstream journals and conferences. His joint work with Mathai Joseph on fault tolerance gives a formal model that defines precisely the notions of fault, error, failure and fault-tolerance, and their relations. It also gives the properties that models of fault-affected programs and fault-tolerant programs in terms of model transformations. They proposed a design process for fault-tolerant systems from requirement specifications and analysis, fault environment identification and analysis, specification of fault-affected design, and verification of fault-tolerance for satisfaction of the requirements specification.

In collaboration with Zhou Chaochen and Anders Ravn, et al., he also developed a Probabilistic Duration Calculus for system dependability analysis. His recent work with He Jifeng and Xiaoshan Li on the rCOS theory of semantics and refinement of object-oriented and component-based design is being developed into a method with tool support for component-based and model-driven software development.

== Conference organization ==
Zhiming Liu is the founder of International Colloquium on Theoretical Aspects of Computing (ICTAC), the International Symposium on Formal Aspects of Component Software (FACS), and International Symposium on Foundations of Health Information Engineering and systems (FHIES). He has served as a PC chair for a number of conferences and a PC member for a number of conferences. He has also edited a number of books.
