= Ernst-Rüdiger Olderog =

German computer scientist

- Born: 4 June 1955; Bredenbek, Schleswig-Holstein, northern Germany
- Education: University of Kiel
- Known for: Editor-in-Chief of Acta Informatica
- Awards: Leibniz Prize (1994)
- Scientific career
- Fields: Computer science; formal methods
- Workplaces: University of Oldenburg
- Thesis: Charakterisierung Hoarescher Systeme für ALGOL-ähnliche Programmiersprachen (1981)
- Doctoral advisor: Hans Langmaack
- Doctoral students: André Platzer, Roland Meyer
- Website: uol.de

Ernst-Rüdiger Olderog (born 4 June 1955) is a German computer scientist. He is a full professor at the University of Oldenburg in Oldenburg, northern Germany. He heads the Correct Systems Design (CSD) group whose research is focused on programming language theory. Their research goal is methods for the systematic development of correct software for parallel and distributed systems under real-time constraints. In 1994, Olderog was awarded the Leibnitz Prize of the German Research Foundation (DFG) for his work. He has authored a number of scientific books and served as editor-in-chief of the journal Acta Informatica and as chairman of the IFIP Working Group 2.2 on Formal Description of Programming Concepts. His work in this Working Group was awarded the IFIP Silver Core in 1998.

== Biography ==
=== Education and academic career ===
Olderog comes from Bredenbek in Schleswig-Holstein, northern Germany, and studied computer science, mathematics and logic at the University of Kiel, where he received his doctorate in 1981 supervised by Hans Langmaack on Hoare-style characterization systems for ALGOL-like programming languages. After several research visits abroad (including the Programming Research Group at the University of Oxford and in Amsterdam, Edinburgh, Yorktown Heights and Saarbrücken), he habilitated also at Kiel University in 1989. Since 1989, Olderog has been based at the Department of Computer Science, University of Oldenburg. He played a leading role in the EU ESPRIT ProCoS project on Provably Correct Systems during 1989–1995. From 1995 to 2005, Olderog served as chairman of the IFIP Working Group 2.2 on Formal Description of Programming Concepts. He was editor-in-chief of the journal Acta Informatica and in 2012 became a member of the Academia Europaea. From 2012 to 2021 Olderog was Speaker of the Graduate School SCARE (I + II) and from 2017 to 2019 he was Dean of the Faculty II.

=== Awards and honors ===
- In 1994, Olderog, together with his colleague Manfred Broy, was awarded the Deutsche Forschungsgemeinschaft (DFG) Gottfried Wilhelm Leibniz Prize, worth three million DM.
- From 1995 to 2005, Olderog was chairman of the IFIP Working Group 2.2 on Formal Description of Programming Concepts.
- In 1998, he received the Silver Core Award from IFIP for his work in this IFIP group.
- Olderog was editor of the journal Acta Informatica
- has been a member of the Academia Europaea since 2012.
- In 2015, a symposium with an associated Festschrift was held at the University of Oldenburg in celebration of his 60th birthday.

== Books ==
Olderog has authored, co-authored, and co-edited the following books:

- Olderog, E.-R. (1991). Nets, Terms and Formulas: Three Views of Concurrent Processes and Their Relationship. Cambridge: Cambridge University Press. ISBN 0-521-01845-5.
- Olderog, E.-R.; Dierks, Henning (2008). Real-Time Systems: Formal Specification and Automatic Verification. Cambridge: Cambridge University Press. ISBN 978-0-521-88333-7.
- Apt, Krzysztof R.; de Boer, Frank. S.; Olderog, E.-R. (2009). Verification of Sequential and Concurrent Programs. Berlin: Springer-Verlag. ISBN 978-1-84882-744-8.
- Hinchey, M. G.; Bowen, J. P.; Olderog, E.-R., eds. (2017). Provably Correct Systems. NASA Monographs in Systems and Software Engineering. Springer. ISBN 978-3319486277.
