= Anders P. Ravn =

Danish computer scientist (1947–2019)

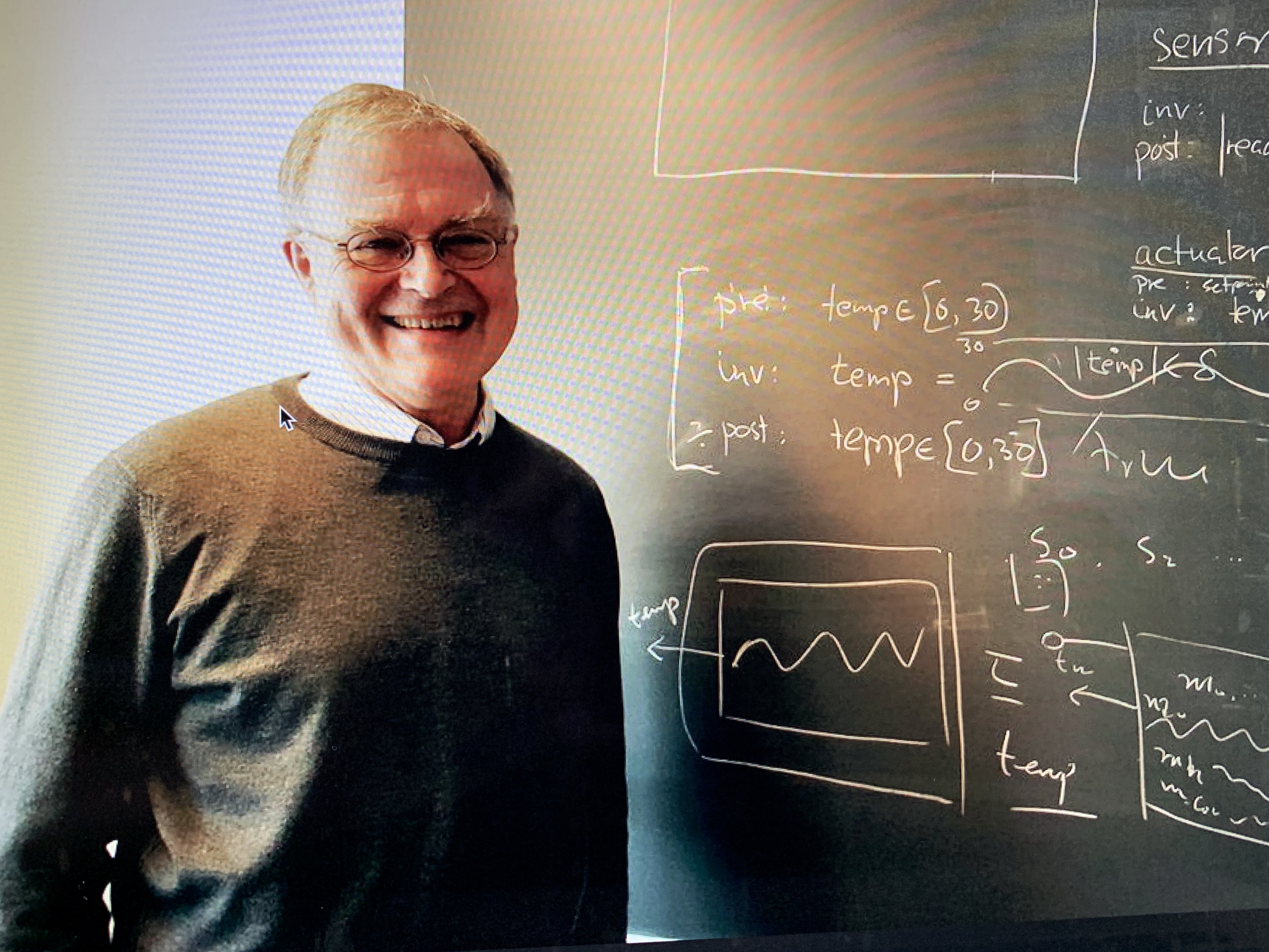
- Anders Ravn in Chongqing, China
- Born: 29 October 1947; Caracas, Venezuela
- Died: 1 August 2019 (aged 71); Copenhagen, Denmark
- Citizenship: Danish
- Education: University of Copenhagen; Technical University of Denmark
- Known for: Duration calculus
- Spouse: Annemette Lind
- Awards: Brinch's Honorary Award (1996); Order of the Dannebrog (2015)
- Scientific career
- Fields: Computer science, software engineering, formal methods
- Workplaces: University of Copenhagen; Technical University of Denmark; Aalborg University
- Website: people.cs.aau.dk/~apr

Anders Peter Ravn (29 October 1947 – 1 August 2019) was a Danish computer scientist.

Anders P. Ravn was born in 1947 in Caracas, Venezuela, the son of Niels and Henny (Sønder) Ravn. He arrived in Denmark in 1948. Ravn received a Master of Science (M.Sc.) degree in computer science and mathematics from the University of Copenhagen in 1973 and a Doctor of Technology (Dr.Tech.) degree in computer science from the Technical University of Denmark in 1995.

Between 1969 and 1973, Anders Ravn was a teaching assistant in the Department of Computer Science at the University of Copenhagen (DIKU). From 1972 to 1976, he was a systems programmer on minicomputers at the early Danish computer company A/S Regnecentralen. He returned to academia and rose from assistant professor (1976–80) to associate professor (1980–84) at DIKU. During 1982–3, he was a visiting scientist at IBM's Thomas J. Watson Research Center in Yorktown Heights, New York, United States. He joined the Department of Computer Science at the Technical University of Denmark (ID-DTH) as a lecturer (1984–9) followed by reader (1989–99) in the Department of Information Technology. During this time, he was also an adjunct lecturer in the Department of Mathematics at the Royal Veterinary and Agricultural University in Denmark (1985–9), guest researcher at Oxford University (1989–90), and visiting professor at the Institut für Praktische Mathematik und Informatik, University of Kiel in Germany (1994). He participated in the EU ESPRIT ProCoS project on Provably Correct Systems. He was a Research Professor in the Department of Computer Science at Aalborg University (1999–2004), before being appointed Professor of Computing Science there (2004–16). He then retired, becoming an emeritus professor.

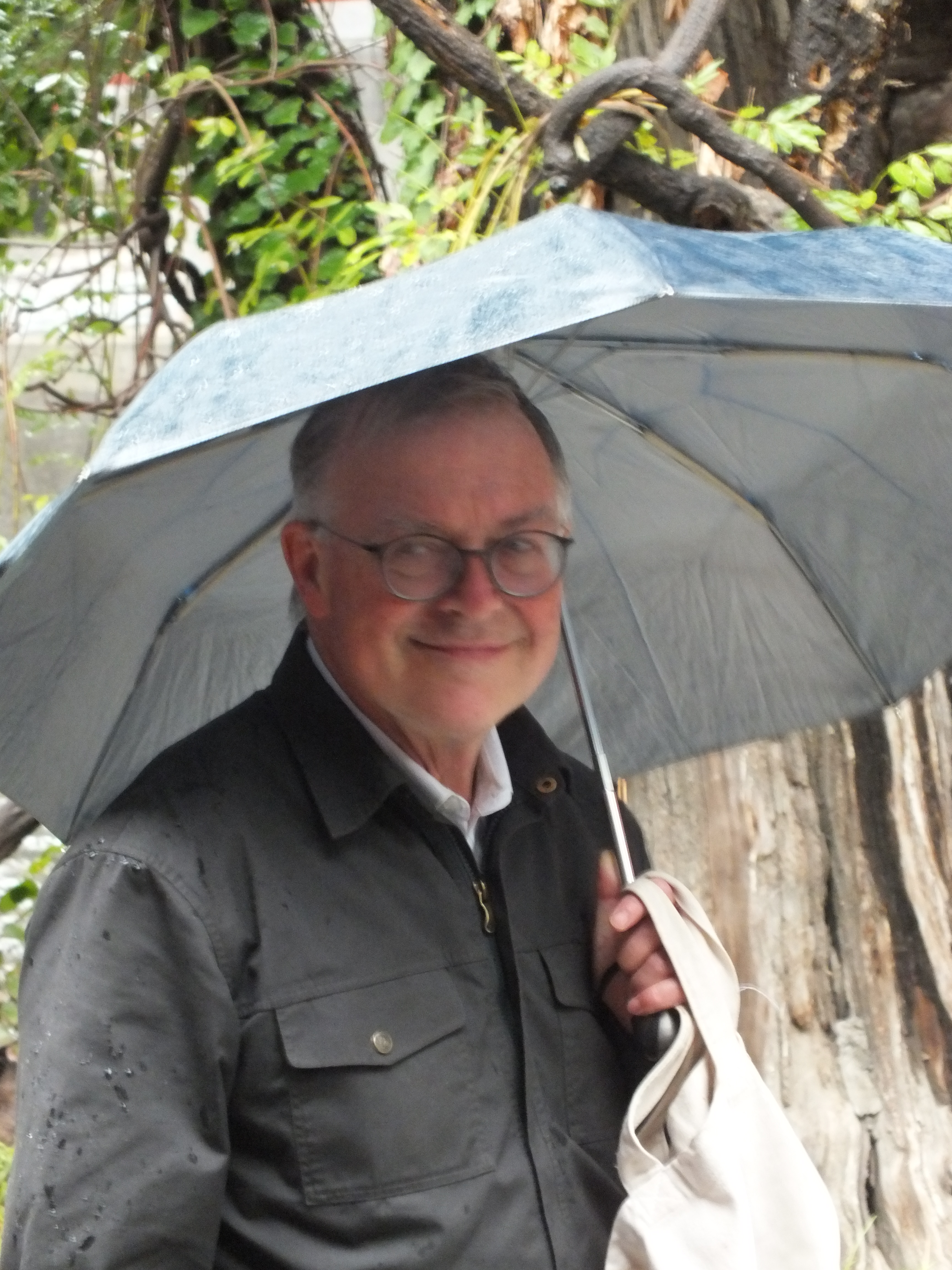
Anders Ravn in China, 2017

Ravn specialized in research into formal methods, especially for embedded systems and hybrid systems. In particular, he worked with Zhou Chaochen and Tony Hoare on the development of duration calculus for real-time systems.

He became a member of the Dansk Selskab for Datalogi (DSfD) in 1972, the Association for Computing Machinery (ACM) in 1983, and was a Life Member of the IEEE Computer Society. He was also a member of the IFIP Working Group 2.2 (covering the Formal Description of Programming Concepts) from 2002.

Anders Ravn received Ulrik and Marie Brinch's honorary award in 1996. He was honoured as a Knight of the Order of the Dannebrog in 2015. He married Annemette Lind on 31 August 1973 and they had two children. Ravn died in Copenhagen on 1 August 2019.

== Selected publications ==
Ravn produced many research papers and edited several books:

- Zhou Chaochen; Hoare, C.A.R.; Ravn, Anders P. (1991). "A calculus of durations". Information Processing Letters. 40 (5): 269–276. doi:10.1016/0020-0190(91)90122-X.
- Grossman, Robert L.; Nerode, Anil; Ravn, Anders P.; Rischel, Hans, eds. (1993). Hybrid Systems. Lecture Notes in Computer Science. Vol. 736. Springer-Verlag. doi:10.1007/3-540-57318-6. ISBN 978-3-540-57318-0. S2CID 199561.
- Ravn, Anders P.; Rischel, Hans, eds. (1998). Formal Techniques in Real-Time and Fault-Tolerant Systems. Lecture Notes in Computer Science. Vol. 1486. Springer-Verlag. doi:10.1007/BFb0055330. ISBN 978-3-540-65003-4. S2CID 42726018.
- Liu, Zhiming; Ravn, Anders P., eds. (2009). Automated Technology for Verification and Analysis. Lecture Notes in Computer Science. Vol. 5799. Springer-Verlag. doi:10.1007/978-3-642-04761-9. ISBN 978-3-642-04760-2.
