= Charles Leonard Hamblin =

Australian philosopher, logician and computer scientist (1922–1985)

- Born: Charles Leonard Hamblin; 20 November 1922; Petersham, New South Wales, New South Wales
- Died: 14 May 1985 (aged 62); Darling Point, New South Wales, New South Wales, Australia
- Occupations: Philosopher; Logician; Computer scientist
- Known for: Reverse Polish notation

Charles Leonard Hamblin (20 November 1922 – 14 May 1985) was an Australian philosopher, logician, and computer pioneer, as well as a professor of philosophy at the New South Wales University of Technology (now the University of New South Wales) in Sydney.

Among his most well-known achievements in the area of computer science was the introduction of Reverse Polish Notation and the use in 1957 of a push-down pop-up stack. This preceded the work of Friedrich Ludwig Bauer and Klaus Samelson on use of a push-pop stack. The stack had been invented by Alan Turing in 1946 when he introduced such a stack in his design of the ACE computer. In philosophy, Hamblin is known for his book Fallacies, a standard work in the area of the false conclusions in logic. In formal semantics, Hamblin is known for his computational model of discourse as well as Hamblin semantics (or alternative semantics), an approach to the semantics of questions.

== Career and life ==
Hamblin was born in Petersham, New South Wales on 20 November 1922. His parents were Charles Oswald Hamblin and Katherine May Whyte. He attended North Sydney Boys High School and Geelong Grammar. Interrupted by the Second World War and radar service in the Australian Air Force, Hamblin's studies included Arts (Philosophy and Mathematics), Science (Physics), and an MA in Philosophy (First Class Honours) at the University of Melbourne. He obtained a doctorate in 1957 at the London School of Economics on the topic Language and the Theory of Information, apparently under Karl Popper, critiquing Claude Shannon's information theory from a semantic perspective. From 1955, he was lecturer at N.S.W. University of Technology, and later professor of philosophy at the same place, until his death in 1985, during which time the organization had been renamed The University of New South Wales.

In the second half of the 1950s, Hamblin worked with the third computer available in Australia, a DEUCE computer manufactured by the English Electric Company. For the DEUCE, he designed one of the first programming languages, later called GEORGE (General Order Generator), which was based on Reverse Polish Notation. His associated compiler (language translator) translated the programs formulated in GEORGE into the machine language of the DEUCE in 1957.

Hamblin's work is considered to be the first to use Reverse Polish Notation, and this is why he is called an inventor of this representation method. Regardless of whether Hamblin independently invented the notation and its usage, he showed the merit, service, and advantage of the Reverse Polish way of writing programs for the processing on programmable computers and algorithms to make it happen.

The second direct result of his work with the development of compilers was the concept of the push-pop stack (previously invented by Alan M. Turing for the ACE in 1945), which Hamblin developed independently of Friedrich Ludwig Bauer and Klaus Samelson. In the same year, 1957, Hamblin presented his stack concept at the first Australian Computer Conference. The compiler was running before that conference. Hamblin's work influenced the development of stack-based computers, their machine instructions, their arguments on a stack, and reference addresses. The design was taken up by English Electric in their KDF9 computer, delivered in 1963.

In the 1960s, Hamblin again increasingly turned to philosophical questions. He wrote an influential introductory book on formal logic which is today a standard work on fallacies. It focused upon the treatment of false conclusions by traditional logic and brought into that treatment formal dialectic and developed it further. As such, Hamblin is considered as one of the founders of the modern informal logic.

Hamblin contributed to the development of modern temporal logic in two ways. In its very early period he corresponded with Arthur Prior between 1958 and 1965; this collaboration culminated with the so-called Hamblin implications. Later in 1972 Hamblin independently rediscovered a form of duration calculus (interval logic), without being aware of the 1947 work of A. G. Walker on this topic, who was not interested in the tense aspect. Hamblin's duration calculus is very similar to that later developed by James Allen and Patrick J. Hayes in the mid 1980s.

Hamblin was familiar with ancient Greek and several Asian and Pacific languages and in 1984 published a polyglot phrasebook on 25 of the latter, including "Burmese, Korean, Japanese, Fijian and Tahitian". A classical music lover who played the piano, Hamblin was setting words of Wittgenstein to music while hospitalized with an affliction that proved fatal.

He was married to Rita Hamblin. They had two daughters, Fiona Katherine and Julie Claire.

He died at Darling Point, New South Wales on 14 May 1985.

== Publications ==
=== Monographs ===
- Fallacies. Methuen London 1970, ISBN 0-416-14570-1 and ISBN 0-416-70070-5 (paperback), new edition of 2004 with Vale Press, ISBN 0-916475-24-7 (paperback) – even today a standard work to the topic.
- Elementary Formal Logic: Programmed Course. London: Methuen, 1967, ISBN 0-416-69820-4
- Imperatives. Blackwell Oxford 1987, ISBN 0-631-15193-1.
- Language and the Theory of Information. PhD Thesis, Logic and Scientific Method Programme, University of London, London, UK. Supervised by Karl Popper, submitted October 1956, awarded 1957.
- Languages of Asia and the Pacific: A Travellers' Phrasebook. London: Angus & Robertson Publishers, 1984, ISBN 0-207-13628-9.
- Linguistics and the Parts of the Mind: Or How to Build a Machine Worth Talking To. Cambridge Scholars Publishing, Cambridge 2017, ISBN 1-527-50292-9, edited by Dr Phillip Staines

=== Articles ===
- "Translation To and From Polish Notation". The Computer Journal 5/3, October 1962, pp. 210–213
- '"An Addressless Coding Scheme based on Mathematical notation". W.R.E. Conference on Computing: Proceedings, Salisbury, Weapons Research Establishment 1957
- "GEORGE, an Addressless Coding Scheme for DEUCE". Australian National Committee on Computation and Automatic Control, Summarized Proceedings of First Conference, Paper C6.1, 1960
- "Computer Languages". The Australian Journal of Science 20, P. 135-139. Reprinted in The Australian Computer Journal 17/4, pp. 195–198 (November 1985)
- "Questions in Montague English". Foundations of Language, 1973, 10: 41–53.

=== Arranged by date order ===
The following list of monographs, papers and articles is based on Peter McBurney's list in "Charles L. Hamblin: Computer Pioneer", published online on 27 July 2008:

- C. L. Hamblin [1957]: An addressless coding scheme based on mathematical notation. Proceedings of the First Australian Conference on Computing and Data Processing, Salisbury, South Australia: Weapons Research Establishment, June 1957.
- C. L. Hamblin [1957]: Computer Languages. The Australian Journal of Science, 20: 135–139. Reprinted here in The Australian Computer Journal, 17(4): 195–198 (November 1985).
- C. L. Hamblin [1957]: Review of: W. R. Ashby: Introduction to Cybernetics. Australasian Journal of Philosophy, 35.
- C. L. Hamblin [1958]: Questions. Australasian Journal of Philosophy, 36(3): 159–168.
- C. L. Hamblin [1958]: Review of: Time and Modality, by A. N. Prior. Australasian Journal of Philosophy, 36: 232–234.
- C. L. Hamblin [1958]: Surprises, innovations and probabilities. Proceedings of the ANU Symposium on Surprise, Canberra, July 1958.
- C. L. Hamblin [1958]: Review of: Formal Analysis of Normative Systems, by A. R. Anderson. Australasian Journal of Philosophy, 36.
- C. L. Hamblin [1958]: GEORGE Programming Manual. Duplicated, 1958. Revised and enlarged, 1959.
- C. L. Hamblin [1959]: The Modal "Probably". Mind, New Series, 68: 234–240.
- C. L. Hamblin [1962]: Translation to and from Polish notation. Computer Journal, 5: 210–213.
- C. L. Hamblin [1963]: Questions aren't statements. Philosophy of Science, 30(1): 62–63.
- R. J. Gillings and C. L. Hamblin [1964]: Babylonian reciprocal tables on UTECOM. Technology, 9 (2): 41–42, August 1964. An expanded version appeared in Australian Journal of Science, 27, 1964.
- C. L. Hamblin [1964]: Has probability any foundations? Proceedings of the Symposium on Probability of the Statistical Society of New South Wales, May 1964. Reproduced in Science Yearbook, University of New South Wales, Sydney, 1964.
- C. L. Hamblin [1964]: Review of: Communication: A Logical Model, by D. Harrah. Australasian Journal of Philosophy, 42.
- C. L. Hamblin [1964]: Review of: Analysis of Questions, by N. D. Belnap. Australasian Journal of Philosophy, 42.
- C. L. Hamblin [1965]: Review of: A Preface to the Logic of Science, by P. Alexander. The British Journal for the Philosophy of Science, 15(60): 360–362.
- C. L. Hamblin [1966]: Elementary Formal Logic, a Programmed Course. (Sydney: Hicks Smith). Republished by Methuen, in London, UK, 1967. Also translated into Swedish by J. Mannerheim, under the title: Element"ar Logik, ein programmerad kurs. (Stockholm: Laromedelsf"orlagen, 1970).
- C. L. Hamblin [1967]: One-valued logic. Philosophical Quarterly, 17: 38–45.
- C. L. Hamblin [1967]: Questions, logic of. Encyclopedia of Philosophy. (New York: Collier Macmillan).
- C. L. Hamblin [1967]: An algorithm for polynomial operations. Computer Journal, 10.
- C. L. Hamblin [1967]: Review of: New Approaches to the Logical Theory of Interrogatives, by L. Aqvist. Australasian Journal of Philosophy, 44.
- C. L. Hamblin [1969]: Starting and stopping. The Monist, 53: 410–425.
- C. L. Hamblin [1970]: Fallacies. London, UK: Methuen.
- C. L. Hamblin [1970]: The effect of when it's said. Theoria, 36: 249–264.
- C. L. Hamblin [1971]: Mathematical models of dialogue. Theoria, 37: 130–155.
- C. L. Hamblin [1971]: Instants and intervals. Studium Generale, 24: 127–134.
- C. L. Hamblin [1972]: You and I. Analysis, 33: 1–4.
- C. L. Hamblin [1972]: Quandaries and the logic of rules. Journal of Philosophical Logic, 1: 74–85.
- C. L. Hamblin [1973]: Questions in Montague English. Foundations of Language, 10: 41–53.
- C. L. Hamblin [1973]: A felicitous fragment of the predicate calculus. Notre Dame Journal of Formal Logic. 14: 433–446.
- C. L. Hamblin [1974]: La logica dell'iniziare e del cessare. Italian translation by C. Pizzi of an unpublished article: The logic of starting and stopping. Pages 295–317 in: C. Pizzi (Editor): La Logica del Tempo. Torino: Bringhieri.
- C. L. Hamblin [1975]: Creswell's colleague TLM. Nous, 9(2): 205–210.
- C. L. Hamblin [1975]: Saccherian arguments and the self-application of logic. Australasian Journal of Philosophy, 53: 157–160.
- C. L. Hamblin [1976]: An improved "Pons Asinorum"? Journal of the History of Philosophy, 14: 131–136.
- C. L. Hamblin [1984]: Languages of Asia and the Pacific: A Phrasebook for Travellers and Students. (North Ryde, NSW: Angus and Robertson).
- C. L. Hamblin [1987]: Imperatives. Oxford, UK: Basil Blackwell.
- C. L. Hamblin and P. J. Staines [1992]: An extraordinarily simple theory of the syllogism. Logique et Analyse, 35: 81.

== Patents ==
- US2849706 "Electronic circuits for deriving a voltage proportional to the logarithm of the magnitude of a variable quantity". Applied 3 Feb. 1953 (applied in Great Britain 4 Feb. 1952), granted 21 Aug. 1958.
- US3008640 "Electric Computing Apparatus". Applied 11 Oct. 1954 (applied in Great Britain 13 Oct. 1953), granted 14 Nov. 1961.
