= Michael Best (disambiguation) =

Michael Best is an American law firm based in Milwaukee, Wisconsin.

Michael Best may also refer to:

- Michael Best (tenor), American operatic tenor
- Michael L. Best, American computer scientist
