= Mathai Joseph =

Indian computer scientist

- Born: India
- Education: Wilson College, Mumbai, University of Bombay, Welsh College of Advanced Technology, University of Cambridge
- Known for: Real-time systems; formal methods
- Awards: 2020 Test-of-Time Award
- Scientific career
- Fields: Computer science
- Workplaces: University of Warwick, Tata Institute of Fundamental Research
- Doctoral advisor: David Wheeler
- Notable students: Paritosh Pandya, Zhiming Liu

Mathai Joseph is an Indian computer scientist and author.

== Early life and education ==
Joseph studied for a BSc in physics at Wilson College (Mumbai, India, 1962) and an MSc in the same subject at the University of Mumbai in 1964. He later studied for a Postgraduate Diploma in electronics at the Welsh College of Advanced Technology (1965) and then undertook a PhD in computing at Churchill College, Cambridge under the supervision of David Wheeler (awarded 1968).

From 1968 to 1985, Joseph worked on programming as a fellow and senior research scientist at the Tata Institute of Fundamental Research (Mumbai, India) and then became professor of computer science at the University of Warwick in England for 12 years (1985–97). He returned to India in 1997. He then worked in industry as executive director at the Tata Research Development and Design Centre (Pune) and as executive vice-president at Tata Consultancy Services (1997–2007).

== Career ==
Joseph was a visiting professor at Carnegie-Mellon University (1980–81), Eindhoven University of Technology (1990–92), the University of Warwick (1997–98), and the University of York (2001–04). He was Board Chair of UNU-IIST (2004–06, United Nations University, Macau). Joseph was the first person from India to be elected to the Council of the ACM. In addition, he was a member of the ACM India Council until 2012. He chaired the ACM India Education Committee until 2014.

Mathai Joseph's main research interest is in the area of formal methods related to computer systems, including real-time systems. His most cited paper, "Finding Response Times in a Real-Time System", with over 1,500 citations on Google Scholar in 2021, was joint work with Paritosh Pandya, published in The Computer Journal in 1986. This paper won a 2020 Test-of-Time Award, announced at the 27th IEEE Real-Time and Embedded Technology and Applications Symposium (RTAS 2021).

Joseph's joint work with Zhiming Liu on fault tolerance gives a formal model that precisely defines the notions of fault, error, failure and fault-tolerance, and their relationships. It also provided the properties that models fault-affected programs and fault-tolerant programs in terms of transformations. Together, they proposed a design process for fault-tolerant systems from requirement specifications and analysis, fault environment identification and analysis, specification of fault-affected design and verification of fault-tolerance for satisfaction of the requirements specification.

Joseph is the author of Digital Republic, a personal reminiscence that also charts the development of Information Technology in India and the issues involved. He is interested in improving science in India.

== Books ==
- Joseph, Mathai; Shyamasundar, R. K., eds. (1984). Foundations of Software Technology and Theoretical Computer Science, Fourth Conference, Bangalore, India, December 13–15, 1984, Proceedings. Lecture Notes in Computer Science. Vol. 181. Springer-Verlag. ISBN 978-3-540-13883-9.
- Joseph, Mathai, ed. (1988). Formal Techniques in Real-Time and Fault-Tolerant Systems, Proceedings of a Symposium, Warwick, UK, September 22–23, 1988. Lecture Notes in Computer Science. Vol. 331. Springer-Verlag. ISBN 978-3-540-50302-6.
- Joseph, Mathai, ed. (1996). Real-Time Systems: Specification, Verification and Analysis. International Series in Computer Science. Prentice Hall. ISBN 978-0-13-455297-2.
- Joseph, Mathai (2013). Digital Republic: India's rise to IT power. Power Publishers. ISBN 978-9-382-79257-4.
- Joseph, Mathai (2017). Dead to Reason. Amazon Kindle. ISBN 978-1-520-65591-8.
