= Rcos =

RCOS, Rcos or rCOS may refer to:

- Royal College of Surgeons in Ireland
- Royal College of Surgeons of England
- Royal College of Surgeons of Edinburgh
- RC Optical Systems
- Rcos (trigonometric function), an archaic trigonometric function
- rCOS (computer sciences), a model in computer sciences
