= Rigorous Approach to Industrial Software Engineering =

1990s software development tools

Rigorous Approach to Industrial Software Engineering (RAISE) was developed as part of the European ESPRIT II LaCoS project in the 1990s, led by Dines Bjørner. It consists of a set of tools designed for a specification language (RSL) for software development. It is especially espoused by UNU-IIST in Macau, who run training courses on site and around the world, especially in developing countries.

== See also ==
- Formal methods
- Formal specification
