= Paritosh =

Paritosh is an Indian first name and may be:

- Paritosh Pandya, Indian computer scientist
- Paritosh Sen, Indian artist
- Paritosh Shukla, Practising Advocate, ll.b. gold medalist
- Paritosh Singh, Bachelors in Technology

Meaning

- One who is fully satisfied, desire nothing and happy in all circumstances
- This name has several mentioning in TULSIDAS written RAMCHARIT MANAS.
