= Ramesh Srinivasan =

American academic (born 1976)

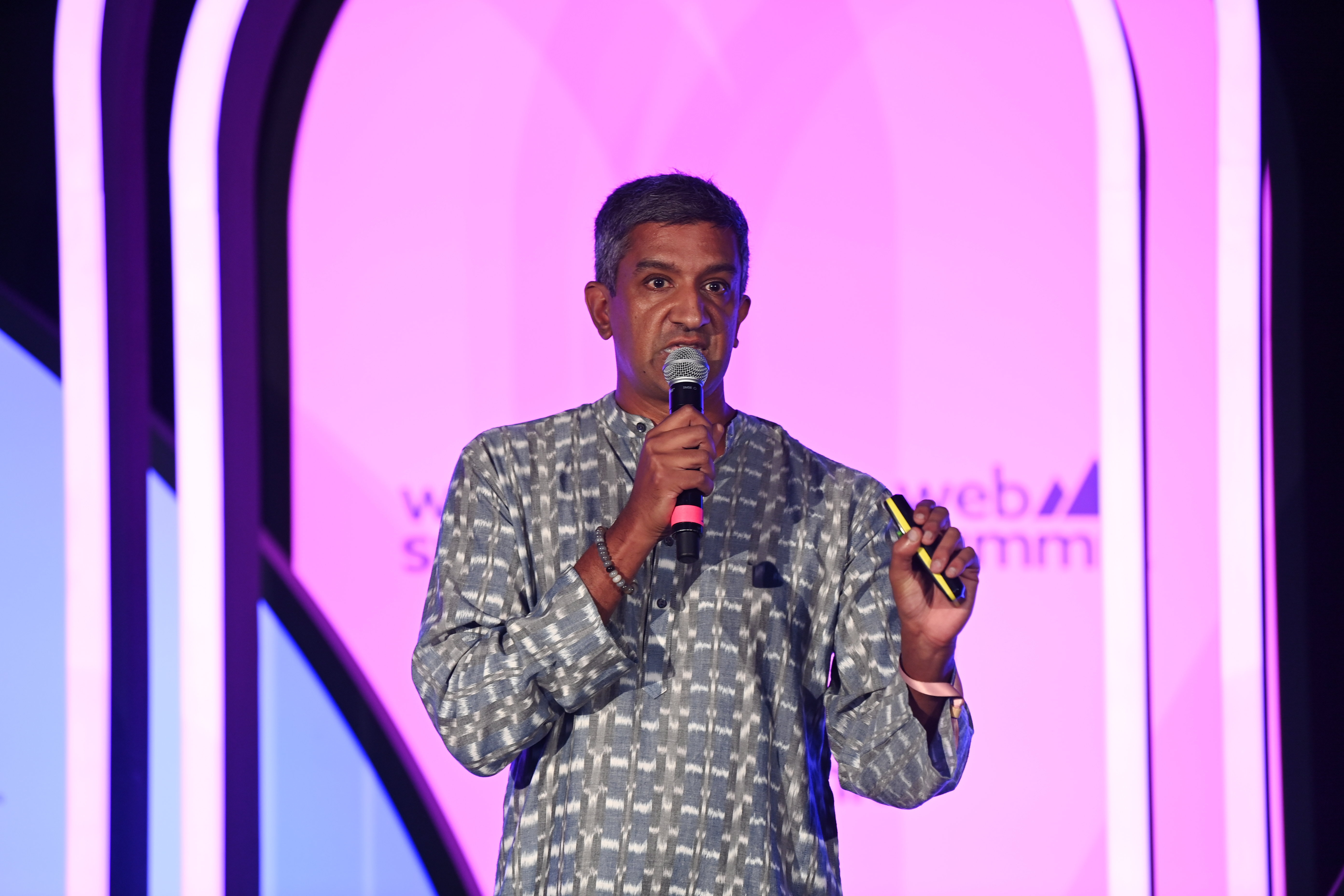
- Srinivasan at the 2023 Web Summit in Lisbon.
- Born: 1976 (age 49–50)
- Occupations: Engineer, social scientist, academic, author, speaker
- Title: Professor and Director, University of California Los Angeles
- Board member of: Awana Digital

Academic background
- Education: B.S., Industrial Engineering (1998) M.S., Media Arts and Sciences (2002) Ph.D., Design and Technology Studies (2005)
- Alma mater: Stanford University, Massachusetts Institute of Technology, Harvard University
- Thesis: Weaving Spatial, Digital and Ethnographic Processes in Community-Driven Media Design (2005)
- Doctoral advisor: Jeffrey Huang, Hashim Sarkis

Academic work
- Discipline: Technology and Society Studies
- Sub-discipline: Digital Media, Cultural Studies, Global Politics, and Technological Ethics
- Institutions: University of California, Los Angeles (UCLA), The Digital Cultures Lab
- Main interests: AI, ethics, visual and environmental design
- Website: rameshsrinivasan.org

Ramesh Srinivasan (born 1976) is an American engineer, social scientist, academic, author, and host of the Utopias podcast. He is Professor of Information Studies at the University of California, Los Angeles, with a joint appointment in Design/Media Arts. Srinivasan is the founder and Director of the Digital Cultures Lab at UCLA since 2015 and serves as Assistant Director of UCLA's DataX initiative. (Note: UCLA's DataX is a campus-wide initiative launched in 2021 to advance research and education in data science and critical data studies. It unites over 40 departments and programs to encourage interdisciplinary collaboration across three core areas: fundamental data science, applied and creative data, and data justice and society. With a $10 million initial investment, DataX supports new faculty hires, interdisciplinary courses, and initiatives like the Collaborathon to promote inclusive, ethical, and socially impactful uses of data across academia and beyond.)

Srinivasan's work focuses on how technologies are impacting political, social, psychological, economic, and ecological realities around the planet. His work discusses the potential of technology to support all people and environmental issues, rather than play into a zero sum game that creates isolation, division, and disconnection. Srinivasan previously served as a national surrogate for Senator Bernie Sanders 2020 presidential campaign, and as an Innovation policy committee member for former President Biden. As of 2025, he also continues to informally advise Rep. Ro Khanna, who has cited his work in his latest book. (Note: Progressive Capitalism: How to Make Tech Work for All of Us (2023)) Srinivasan has been working with multiple state legislators on AI rights, regulations, including within the state of California.

He has written three books. His most recent book Beyond the Valley: How Innovators around the World are Overcoming Inequality and Creating the Technologies of Tomorrow (2019), was listed among Forbes' top technology books of 2019, and his work has been referenced by New York Times columnist Thomas Friedman regarding digital rights.

Srinivasan is a member of the board of directors at Awana Digital, a nonprofit that works and collaborates with land protectors in the Amazon. He is an adviser to New_Public, One Project, and the Huntington Library.

== Early life and education ==
Srinivasan was born to Indian parents originally from the southern Indian region of Tamil Nadu. He received a bachelor's degree in Industrial Engineering from Stanford University, then a master's degree in Media Studies from the MIT Media Lab. He earned his PhD in Design from Harvard University. His doctoral thesis was titled "Weaving Spatial, Digital and Ethnographic Processes in Community-Driven Media Design". From 2004 to 2005, he served as a teaching fellow at the Harvard Graduate School of Design and the Department of Visual and Environmental Design. He also was an adjunct faculty member at the University of California, San Diego between 2004-2005 where he taught between the departments of Communications, Arts, and Ethnic Studies.

== Career ==
Srinivasan has been a faculty member at the University of California, Los Angeles (UCLA) since 2005, serving in both the School of Education and Information Studies and the Design|Media Arts department. He is the founder and director of the UCLA Digital Cultures Lab, a University of California. (Note: An initiative that conducts interdisciplinary, people-centered research on how emerging technologies shape political, economic, cultural, and environmental dynamics across the globe. The Digital Cultures Lab collaborates with partners and supports various projects, encouraging critical dialogue on issues such as digital rights, algorithmic equity, and the future of democratic media systems.)

In 2024, Srinivasan launched the Utopias podcast, featuring conversations with leading thinkers including journalists, artists, monks, politicians, and scholars , about technology, society, and the future.

Srinivasan previously served as a national surrogate for Senator Bernie Sanders 2020 presidential campaign, and as an Innovation policy committee member for President Biden.

=== Media appearances and public engagement ===
Srinivasan is a monthly panelist on The Young Turks. He has given TEDx Talks and made regular appearances on MSNBC, Al Jazeera, Democracy Now!, National Public Radio (NPR), and Public Radio International. He has written for or been interviewed by media outlets such as the New York Times, the Washington Post, the Guardian, as well as French, German (Frankfurter Allgemeine Zeitung and Süddeutsche Zeitung.) Indian (The Hindu), and Brazilian publications.

=== Writing ===
Srinivasan's books include Whose Global Village? Rethinking How Technology Impacts Our World (2017), After the Internet (2017) with Adam Fish, and Beyond the Valley (2019), which Forbes listed as a top ten tech book in 2019.

Whose Global Village (2017) investigates the possibility of designing and creating technologies to support diverse communities and cultures around the world, with an eye toward his fieldwork and time collaborating with indigenous communities (Native Americans, in India, Bolivia, and in recent years in Oaxaca and Southern Mexico). After the Internet (2017) (Note: With Adam Fish) studies major topics in technology and activism such as hackers, the Arab Spring, Wikileaks, the Icelandic Pirate Party. Whereas Beyond the Valley (2020) presents a vision for tech that lifts up democracy, economic security, environmental sustainability around the world with examples from Africa, Latin America, Asia, and North America/Europe.

In both his 2019 Wired opinion article and his book Beyond the Valley (2019), Srinivasan explores how communities in the Global South—particularly in Africa, South Asia, and South America—are developing alternative models of technological innovation. He argued that communities in these regions are not merely passive consumers of Western technology but active creators and innovators, often developing solutions tailored to local needs and constraints. Citing examples such as Kenya's M-PESA mobile banking platform and community-run cellular networks in Mexico, Srinivasan contrasted grassroots, user-driven innovation with traditional Silicon Valley's top-down, profit-oriented models. The book presents an alternative vision whereby technologies can support economically secure and democratic outcomes for people around the world.

==== Case study: Oaxaca's community networks ====
In Beyond the Valley, Srinivasan documented the Telecomunicaciones Indígenas Comunitarias (TIC) initiative in Oaxaca, described as "described as one of the largest community-owned cell phone networks." Founded in 2012 by indigenous leaders, hackers, and activists, TIC provides mobile connectivity to over sixty communities in a region where traditional telecom companies have long failed to invest. Srinivasan noted how TIC is governed by local assemblies and designed with "comunalidad," a philosophy of collective life central to indigenous Oaxacan culture. He wrote:

"Each community owns GSM (cell phone towers)… allowing them to call one another locally and across regions for a fraction of the normal, commercial price."

Srinivasan also described his field visits to communities like Santa Maria Yaviche in the Sierra Juárez mountains, where he observed how TIC networks operate amidst biodiversity and linguistic richness.

== Research ==
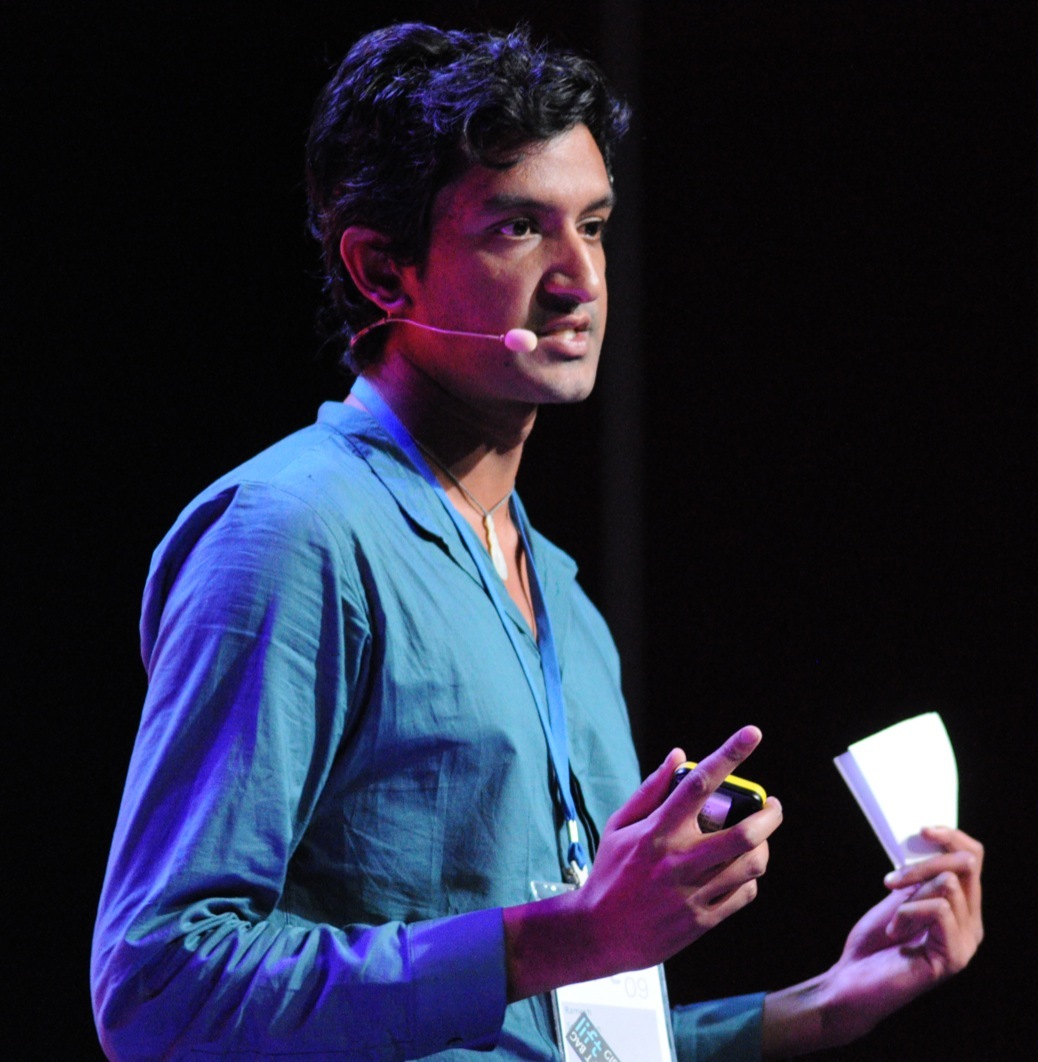
Ramesh Srinivasan

=== On culture and technology ===
==== Reflective Media and Community Empowerment ====
In his 2012 article "Rethinking Digital Cultures and Divides: The Case for Reflective Media", Srinivasan challenged prevailing models of digital development by introducing the concept of "reflective media"—media technologies that enable marginalized communities to express, reflect on, and act upon their own aspirations and social conditions. Through a two-year comparative study in rural Andhra Pradesh, India, Srinivasan examined how providing video cameras to members of a nonliterate village (Ardhavaram) fostered community agency, consensus-building, and collective action, compared to a control village (Kesavaram) that relied on traditional oral meetings.

The study demonstrated that reflective media can interrupt what Appadurai termed the "capacity to aspire" deficit among marginalized communities. By enabling communities to document, share, and collectively reflect on their experiences, video technology catalyzed the emergence of indigenous voice and collective agency. This work critiqued both top-down "access-driven" initiatives and bottom-up participatory models for failing to cultivate authentic community voice and aspiration.

==== Egypt and the Arab Spring ====
His field research in Egypt following the 2011 uprising questioned whether social media platforms like Twitter and Facebook were the primary drivers of the revolution. Interviews with Egyptian protestors revealed a stark contrast between the grievances voiced by elite social media users and those expressed by working-class demonstrators. While the former emphasized abstract ideals such as liberty, the latter focused on concrete economic concerns like wages and job security. He emphasized that the physical presence and participation of people from poorer neighborhoods—not just digital activism—were crucial in sustaining the protest movement. Srinivasan also critiqued the echo chamber effect of social media, where retweets and shared content distorted on-the-ground realities, sometimes amplifying misinformation.

==== Bolivia and indigenous media ====
Srinivasan has conducted ethnographic research in Bolivia that focused on how indigenous communities use traditional technologies like radio to maintain cultural identity and organize collective action. He found that radio, due to its low cost and oral nature, serves as a vital communication tool across Bolivia's diverse regions—particularly among Aymara women, labor unions, and Amazonian tribes. Unlike more individualized digital platforms, radio fosters synchronous, communal listening experiences, reinforcing local cohesion and democratic engagement. The fieldwork revealed both the empowering potential and the political complexities of community-run and state-funded radio.

==== Reimagining Ontology in New Media ====
In his article "Re-thinking the Cultural Codes of New Media: The Question Concerning Ontology", Srinivasan called for a fundamental shift in how digital systems are designed, advocating for an inclusive, culturally situated approach to new media. He critiqued the dominance of Western ontologies embedded in algorithms, databases, and digital infrastructures, arguing that these often marginalize or erase the knowledge systems of non-Western communities. Based on various philosophical traditions and fieldwork, Srinivasan proposed "fluid" and "process" ontologies as alternatives—models co-created with local communities to reflect their values, practices, and epistemologies.

==== A Social Contract for Technology ====
In their 2023 paper "A New Social Contract for Technology", Srinivasan and Dipayan Ghosh argued that the current digital landscape, dominated by unregulated technology giants, necessitates a fundamental renegotiation of the relationship between tech corporations and society. Based on social contract theory dating back to Hobbes, Locke, and Rousseau, they proposed extending this framework beyond state-citizen relationships to include the private corporations that now exert "governing" influence over digital life.

In the proposed social contract, digital rights must go beyond viewing data as property to recognizing it as an extension of human agency and dignity. They advocate for comprehensive policy interventions including consumer privacy rights with opt-out as default, radical transparency in algorithmic systems, antitrust enforcement and utility-style regulation, and economic reforms such as data compensation, universal basic income programs, and support for digital cooperatives.

==== "Fluid Ontologies" in Technology Design ====
Srinivasan is known for his work on the cultural implications of technology. In his book Whose Global Village? Rethinking How Technology Shapes Our World (2017), he introduced the concept of "fluid ontologies"—a methodology that adapts technology design to align with local cultural contexts and community priorities. Drawing on ethnographic research from diverse settings, including Native American communities, rural India, and Zapatista territories in Mexico, Srinivasan emphasized the need for collaboration between technology developers and marginalized communities. His work stressed how technologies can be adapted to reflect cultural diversity and foster local agency, challenging the universalist and deterministic assumptions of global technology practices.

=== On technology and democracy ===
==== Advocacy for a People-Centered Internet ====
Srinivasan has emerged as a critic of Big Tech's influence on modern society. In his 2019 book Beyond the Valley: How Innovators Around the World Are Overcoming Inequality and Creating the Technologies of Tomorrow, he explored how corporate-driven technological advancements have deepened inequalities, eroded workers' rights, and commodified user data. The book presents case studies from around the world demonstrating alternatives to Silicon Valley's model.

Srinivasan documents indigenous communities in Oaxaca, Mexico, building their own cellular infrastructure governed by local assemblies, Detroit communities creating worker-owned digital platforms, and Kenya's M-PESA mobile banking system as an example of innovation from the Global South designed for local needs rather than profit maximization. These examples demonstrate how technology can serve collective social mobility when developed through grassroots processes rather than top-down corporate models. He advocates for decentralization, cooperative ownership structures, and regulatory frameworks that prioritize human well-being over corporate profit.

===== Digital Bill of Rights =====
In a 2020 Guardian article, Srinivasan argued for an American "digital bill of rights" to protect citizens from surveillance capitalism and algorithmic manipulation. He emphasized that privacy is not merely about hiding information but about preserving human agency—"our capacity to hold power over our own lives to dream, grow, be, and aspire."

===== Technology policy =====
Srinivasan has worked with Congressman Ro Khanna on technology policy initiatives aimed at democratizing the digital economy and protecting workers' rights in the age of automation.

Automation and Labor

In a 2019 Los Angeles Times op-ed, Srinivasan analyzed the societal impacts of automation and AI on labor markets, proposing policy interventions to ensure technology serves workers rather than displacing them.

==== Critique of Tech solutionism ====
Trained as an engineer but identifying as an ethnographer, Srinivasan has become a vocal critic of techno-solutionism—the belief that digital technologies alone can solve societal problems. Drawing from his field experiences in Bolivia and other regions, he argued that the global digital divide is not just about access but also about cultural sovereignty and relevance. He critiqued projects like Facebook's internet.org and other corporate-led connectivity efforts for failing to serve the actual needs of local communities, advocating instead for grassroots-designed technologies that reflect local histories, values, and infrastructures.

=== On social media and activism ===
Srinivasan has published extensively on the role of social media in political movements. His 2011 Washington Post article "Five Myths About Social Media" challenged common assumptions about digital activism's effectiveness. His research on social media's role in various political contexts includes studies of Kyrgyzstan's political transformation and analysis of free speech issues in digital platforms.

=== Field research ===
Srinivasan has conducted ethnographic research worldwide, including work with bloggers who participated in the overthrow of an authoritarian regime in Kyrgyzstan, non-literate tribal populations in India to study how literacy emerges through uses of technology, and traditional Native American communities to study how non-Western understandings of the world can introduce new ways of looking at cultural heritage and the future of the internet and networked technologies.

=== Professional affiliations ===
Srinivasan is a member of the Institute of Electrical and Electronics Engineers (IEEE), the American Anthropological Association, and serves on the editorial boards of Science, Technology, & Human Values, International Journal of E-Politics, and Information Technologies and International Development.

== Selected publications ==
=== Books ===
- Srinivasan, R.; Fish, A. (2017). After the Internet. John Wiley & Sons.
- Srinivasan, R. (2017). Whose Global Village?: Rethinking How Technology Shapes Our World. NYU Press.
- Srinivasan, R. (2019). Beyond the Valley: How Innovators Around the World Are Overcoming Inequality and Creating the Technologies of Tomorrow. MIT Press.

=== Essays ===
- Srinivasan, R. (2012). "Rethinking Digital Cultures and Divides: The Case for Reflective Media". The Information Society. 28 (1): 24–36. doi:10.1080/01972243.2011.630775.
- Srinivasan, R. (2013). "Re-thinking the Cultural Codes of New Media: The Question Concerning Ontology". New Media & Society. 15 (2): 203–223. doi:10.1177/1461444812450686.
- Srinivasan, R.; Ghosh, D. (2023). "A New Social Contract for Technology". Policy & Internet. 15 (1): 117–132. doi:10.1002/poi3.330.
- Srinivasan, R. (2006). "Indigenous, Ethnic and Cultural Articulations of New Media". International Journal of Cultural Studies. 9 (4): 497–518. doi:10.1177/1367877906069899.
- Srinivasan, R.; Fish, A. (2009). "Internet Authorship: Social and Political Implications within Kyrgyzstan". Journal of Computer-Mediated Communication. 14 (3): 559–580. doi:10.1111/j.1083-6101.2009.01453.x.

== See also ==
- Digital divide
- Surveillance capitalism
- Platform cooperativism
- Digital rights
- Algorithmic bias
- Community media
