= International Journal of Communication =

- Discipline: Communication, media studies
- Language: English
- Edited by: Larry Gross

Publication details
- History: 2007–present
- Publisher: USC Annenberg Press (United States)
- Frequency: Continuously
- License: CC BY-NC-ND

Standard abbreviations
- ISO 4: Int. J. Commun.

Indexing
- ISSN: 1932-8036
- LCCN: 2006213087
- OCLC no.: 70824656

Links
- Journal homepage; Online archives

The International Journal of Communication is an open access peer-reviewed academic journal covering studies on communication. The founding editor-in-chief was Larry Gross (USC Annenberg School for Communication and Journalism) and it is published by the USC Annenberg Press (University of Southern California). Starting with Volume 18 in January 2024 the editor-in-chief is Silvio Waisbord of George Washington University. The journal was established in 2007 and is abstracted and indexed by the Social Sciences Citation Index, Current Contents/Social & Behavioral Sciences, and EBSCOhost. As of January 2024 the Journal has 150,000 registered users around the globe.

The journal publishes continuously, posting articles as soon as they are accepted.
