= Hans Langmaack =

German mathematician and computer scientist

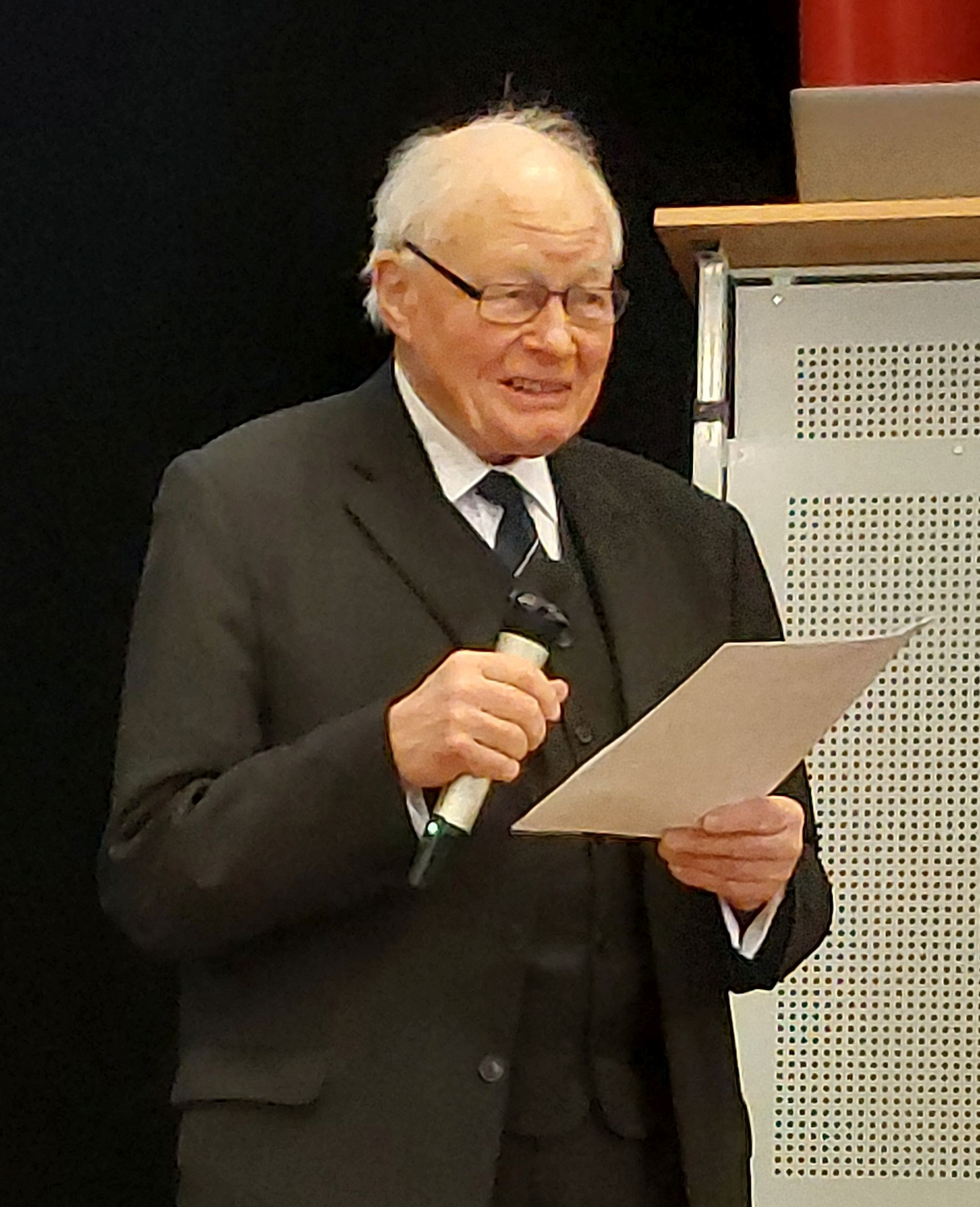
- Langmaack in 2025
- Born: 7 May 1934 (age 92); Hof Helle, Steinburg, Germany
- Education: Bismarck School, Elmshorn
- Alma mater: University of Münster
- Known for: Compiler research
- Scientific career
- Fields: Computer science Mathematics; Formal methods
- Workplaces: University of Mainz; Technical University of Munich; Purdue University; Saarland University; University of Kiel
- Thesis: Zur Konstruktion von Holomorphiehüllen unverzweigter Gebiete über dem Cn (1960)
- Doctoral advisor: Heinrich Adolph Behnke
- Doctoral students: Ursula Hill-Samelson; Ernst-Rüdiger Olderog; Bernhard Steffen
- Website: informatik.uni-kiel.de

Hans Langmaack (born 7 May 1934) is a German mathematician and computer scientist.

== Life ==
Hans Langmaack attended the Bismarck School in Elmshorn, where he received a prize in natural sciences (the Ernst Hermann Koelln Prize, 1951) and, before graduating from high school in 1954, completed an analog computer for spherical trigonometry as a mathematical year's work. After an internship in mechanical engineering, he studied mathematics, physics, and logic at the University of Münster (and one semester in Freiburg) from the winter semester of 1954. In 1957, he passed the teaching examination, became a scholarship holder of the German Academic Scholarship Foundation, and received his doctorate in 1960 under Heinrich Behnke with a dissertation on analysis in several complex variables (construction of holomorphic hulls of unramified regions over $\mathbb C^n$).

From 1960, Langmaack was an assistant to Klaus Samelson at the University of Mainz and turned to computer science. From 1960 to 1962, he developed with Ursula Hill-Samelson the Algol 60 Alcor Mainz 2002 compiler for Siemens, further developed from 1962 to 1964 at the Technical University of Munich (where Samelson moved in 1963 and where Langmaack followed him as an assistant and later senior assistant) to Alcor Munich 2002. From 1966 to 1967, he was an assistant professor of Computer Science at Purdue University, and in 1967, he qualified as a professor at the Technical University of Munich (on Lidskii's theorem, concerning eigenvalues of sums of Hermitian matrices). He was then a lecturer and scientific advisor at the Technical University of Munich and, from 1970, a full professor at the University of Saarland. In 1974, he moved to the Christian Albrecht University of Kiel (Chair of Programming Languages and Compiler Construction). In 1999, he became a professor emeritus.

Langmaack was involved in various industrial compiler projects (including Lisp, BASIC, and Pascal) and expert systems and worked on verified compilers and automated software verification. From 1989 to 1995, Langaack participated in the EU ESPRIT ProCoS project on Provably Correct Systems, as the site leader at Kiel. He has published on Chomsky grammars, among other subjects.

In 1973, Langmaack was a visiting scientist at the Federal University of Rio de Janeiro, in 1974 in Oslo, and in 1981 at the University of Wisconsin-Madison. In 1980, he was a co-initiator (with Friedrich L. Bauer and Klaus Indermark) of the biennial colloquium series Programmiersprachen und Grundlagen der Programmierung (KPS, Programming Languages and Fundamentals of Programming). In 1998, he was awarded an honorary doctorate by the Technical University of Munich. A Festschrift volume was published for his retirement in 1999.

== Publications ==
- with Albert A. Grau, Ursula Hill: Handbook of Automatic Computation I b: Translation of Algol 60 (Fundamentals of the Mathematical Sciences, Vol. 137). Springer, Berlin/Heidelberg/New York, 1967.
- with Peter Kandzia: Informatics: Programming. Teubner, Stuttgart, 1973, ISBN 3-519-02321-0.
