= Dines Bjørner =

Danish computer scientist

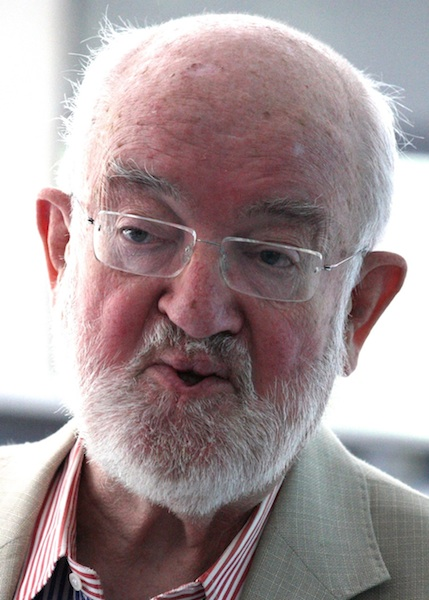
- Born: 4 October 1937 (age 88); Odense, Denmark
- Education: Technical University of Denmark
- Known for: Vienna Development Method, RAISE specification language
- Awards: Order of the Dannebrog (1985); FME Fellowship (2021); IFIP Fellow (2023)
- Scientific career
- Fields: Computer science
- Workplaces: Technical University of Denmark; United Nations University

Dines Bjørner (born 4 October 1937) is a Danish computer scientist.

He specializes in research into domain engineering, requirements engineering and formal methods. He worked with Cliff Jones and others on the Vienna Development Method (VDM) at IBM Laboratory Vienna (and elsewhere). He played a leading role in the EU ESPRIT ProCoS project on Provably Correct Systems during 1989–1995. Later he was involved with producing the RAISE (Rigorous Approach to Industrial Software Engineering) formal method with tool support.

Bjørner was a professor at the Technical University of Denmark (DTU) from 1965–1969 and 1976–2007, before he retired in March 2007. He was responsible for establishing the United Nations University International Institute for Software Technology (UNU-IIST), Macau, in 1992 and was its first director. His magnum opus on software engineering (three volumes) appeared in 2005/6.

To support VDM, Bjørner co-founded VDM-Europe, which subsequently became Formal Methods Europe, an organization that supports conferences and related activities. In 2003, he instigated the associated ForTIA Formal Techniques Industry Association.

Bjørner became a knight of the Order of the Dannebrog in 1985. He received a Dr.h.c. from the Masaryk University, Brno, Czech Republic in 2004. In 2021, he obtained a Dr. techn. from the Technical University of Denmark, Kongens Lyngby, Denmark. He is a Fellow of the IEEE (2004) and ACM (2005). He has also been a member of the Academia Europaea since 1989.

In 2007, a Symposium was held in Macau in honour of Dines Bjørner and Zhou Chaochen. In 2021, Bjørner was elected to a Formal Methods Europe (FME) Fellowship.

Bjørner is married to Kari Bjørner, with two children and five grandchildren.

== Selected books ==
- Domain Science and Engineering: A Foundation for Software Development, Bjørner, D. Monographs in Theoretical Computer Science, An EATCS Series, Springer Nature. Hardcover ISBN 978-3-030-73483-1; softcover ISBN 978-3-030-73486-2; eBook ISBN 978-3-030-73484-8 (2021).
- Software Engineering 1: Abstraction and Modelling, Bjørner, D. Texts in Theoretical Computer Science, An EATCS Series, Springer-Verlag. ISBN 3-540-21149-7 (2005).
- Software Engineering 2: Specification of Systems and Languages, Bjørner, D. Texts in Theoretical Computer Science, An EATCS Series, Springer-Verlag. ISBN 3-540-21150-0 (2006).
- Software Engineering 3: Domains, Requirements, and Software Design, Bjørner, D. Texts in Theoretical Computer Science, An EATCS Series, Springer-Verlag. ISBN 3-540-21151-9 (2006).
- Formal Specification and Software Development, Bjørner, D. and Jones, C.B. Prentice Hall International Series in Computer Science, Prentice Hall. ISBN 0-13-329003-4 (1982).
- The Vienna Development Method: The Meta-Language, Bjørner, D. and Jones, C.B. (editors). Lecture Notes in Computer Science, Volume 61, Springer-Verlag. ISBN 3-540-08766-4 (1978).

== See also ==
- International Journal of Software and Informatics
