= International World Wide Web Conference Committee =

- Founded: August 1994
- Founder: Joseph Hardin and Robert Cailliau
- Type: non-profit International Association
- Purpose: Development of the World Wide Web by hosting the annual World Wide Web Conference
- Location: Geneva, Switzerland
- Region served: Earth
- Owner: IW3C2
- Website: Official website

The International World Wide Web Conference Committee (abbreviated as IW3C2 also written as IW^{3}C^{2}) is a professional non-profit organization registered in Switzerland (Article 60ff of the Swiss Civil Code) that promotes World Wide Web research and development. The IW3C2 organizes and hosts the annual World Wide Web Conference in conjunction with the W3C.

The IW3C2 was founded by Joseph Hardin and Robert Cailliau at a meeting held in Boston, United States, on 14 August 1994 to prepare for the upcoming Second International World Wide Web Conference in Chicago. The IW3C2 formally became an incorporated entity in May 1996 at the fifth conference in Paris, France.

The organization is governed by laws of the Swiss Confederation and the By-laws.

== Abbreviation ==
The abbreviation for the International World Wide Web Conference Committee as IW3C2 is as follows:

- I- The I is represents the leading I in International.
- W3- The W3 represents the three 3 leading W's in World Wide Web.
- C2- The C2 represents the three 2 leading C's in Conference Committee.

== Mission ==
The mission of the IW3C2 is:

- To coordinate the organization and planning of the international WWW conference series and ensure that it remains the foremost conference addressing World Wide Web research and development;
- To promote a collaborative spirit among conference attendees that is essential to the success of the series;
- To ensure the global geographical diversity of conference sites and provide support to local organizers at those sites;
- To make sure that all content arising from these conferences and forums is permanently and openly available on the widest possible scale;
- To preserve the history of the conference series;
- To encourage the global development of the World Wide Web through collaboration with WWW standards organizations;
- To provide a permanent, broad-based international body to achieve these purposes.

== Conferences ==
The conferences are organized by the IW3C2 in collaboration with local organizing committees and technical program committees. The series provides an open forum in which all opinions can be presented, subject to a strict process of peer review. The proceedings of the conference are published in the ACM Digital Library.

=== Endorsed conferences ===
The IW3C2 has endorsed regional conferences devoted to a special topic of the Web by working with endorsed conferences on cross-promotion, publicity and programs.

== Membership ==
Members of the IW3C2 are ordinary members, ex officio members, non-voting members, and officers.

=== Ordinary members ===
Ordinary members are elected for a period of 3 years during a general meeting. Members are nominated due to their recognition in the WWW community and represent themselves. Members can be re-elected only after at least one year of absence.

The following are the founding members at the time when IW3C2 was officially incorporated in May 1996:

- Jean-François Abramatic
- Tim Berners-Lee
- Robert Cailliau
- Dale Dougherty
- Ira Goldstein
- Joseph Hardin
- Tim Krauskopf
- Detlef Krömker
- Corinne Moore
- R. P. Channing Rodgers
- Albert Vezza
- Stuart Weibel
- Yuri Rubinsky (died prior to incorporation)

The following are the current (April 2016) ordinary members:

- Robin Chen
- Chin-Wan Chung
- Allan Ellis
- Wendy Hall - IW3C2 Chair
- Ivan Herman
- Arun Iyengar - IW3C2 Vice Chair
- Irwin King
- Yoelle Maarek
- Luc Mariaux - IW3C2 Treasurer
- Daniel Schwabe - IW3C2 Vice-Chair

=== Ex officio members ===
Ex officio members are selected from the immediate past conference general co-chairs and from future conference co-chairs. Their term expires one year after the conference they organized. Ex officio members can be elected as ordinary members.

The following are current (April 2016) ex officio members and the conference with which they are affiliated:

- Jacqueline Bourdeau - WWW2016
- James Hendler - WWW2016
- Rick Barrett - WWW2017
- Rick Cummings - WWW2017
- Laurent Flory - WWW2018
- Fabien Gandon - WWW2018

=== Officers ===
The IW3C2 officers consist of a chairperson, a vice-chair (chairperson-elect), a secretary, a treasurer, and other appointees. Officers are elected during a general meeting (usually at the annual WWW conference) and serve for one year. They can be re-elected an indefinite number of times.

== The Seoul Test of Time Award ==
This annual award, presented at the WWW conference, is made possible by a generous contribution from the organizers of WWW2014 (Seoul Korea). Recipients are determined by the IW3C2 and honor the author, or authors, of a paper presented at a previous WWW conference that has "stood the test of time." The first award, announced at WWW2015 (Florence Italy), recognized Sergey Brin and Larry Page, the founders of Google. The recipients of the WWW2016 award are LinkIn scientist Dr. Badrul Sarwar and University of Minnesota professors George Karypis, Joseph Konstan, and John Riedl (posthumous) for their work in item-item collaborative filtering.

== See also ==
- History of the World Wide Web
- World Wide Web Conference
