= Zhou Chaochen =

Chinese computer scientist

- 周巢尘
- Born: 1 November 1937 (age 88); Nanhui, Shanghai, China
- Education: Peking University; Chinese Academy of Sciences
- Known for: Duration calculus
- Awards: Academician of the Chinese Academy of Sciences
- Scientific career
- Fields: Computer science
- Workplaces: Peking University; Chinese Academy of Sciences; University of Oxford; Technical University of Denmark; United Nations University

Zhou Chaochen (Chinese: 周巢尘; born 1 November 1937) is a Chinese computer scientist.

Zhou was born in Nanhui, Shanghai, China. He studied as an undergraduate at the Department of Mathematics and Mechanics, Peking University (1954–1958) and as a postgraduate at the Institute of Computing Technology, Chinese Academy of Sciences (CAS) (1963–1967).

He worked at Peking University and CAS until his visit to the Oxford University Computing Laboratory (now the Oxford University Department of Computer Science) (1989–1992). During this time, he was the prime investigator of the duration calculus, an interval logic for real-time systems as part of the European ESPRIT ProCoS project on Provably Correct Systems.

During the periods 1990–1992 and 1995–1996, Zhou Chaochen was a visiting professor at the Department of Computer Science, Technical University of Denmark, Lyngby, on the invitation of Professor Dines Bjørner. He was Principal Research Fellow (1992–1997) and later Director of UNU-IIST in Macau (1997–2002), until his retirement, when he returned to Beijing.

In 2007, Zhou and Dines Bjørner, the first Director of UNU-IIST, were honoured on the occasion of their 70th birthdays. Zhou is a member of the Chinese Academy of Sciences.

== Books ==
- Zhou, Chaochen and Hansen, Michael R., Duration Calculus: A Formal Approach to Real-Time Systems. Springer-Verlag, Monographs in Theoretical Computer Science, An EATCS Series, 2003. ISBN 3-540-40823-1.
