= The Web Conference =

Annual international academic conference

- Logo of the First International Conference on the World-Wide Web (1994)
- Abbreviation: WWW
- Discipline: World Wide Web

Publication details
- Publisher: IW3C2
- History: 1994–present
- Frequency: Annual

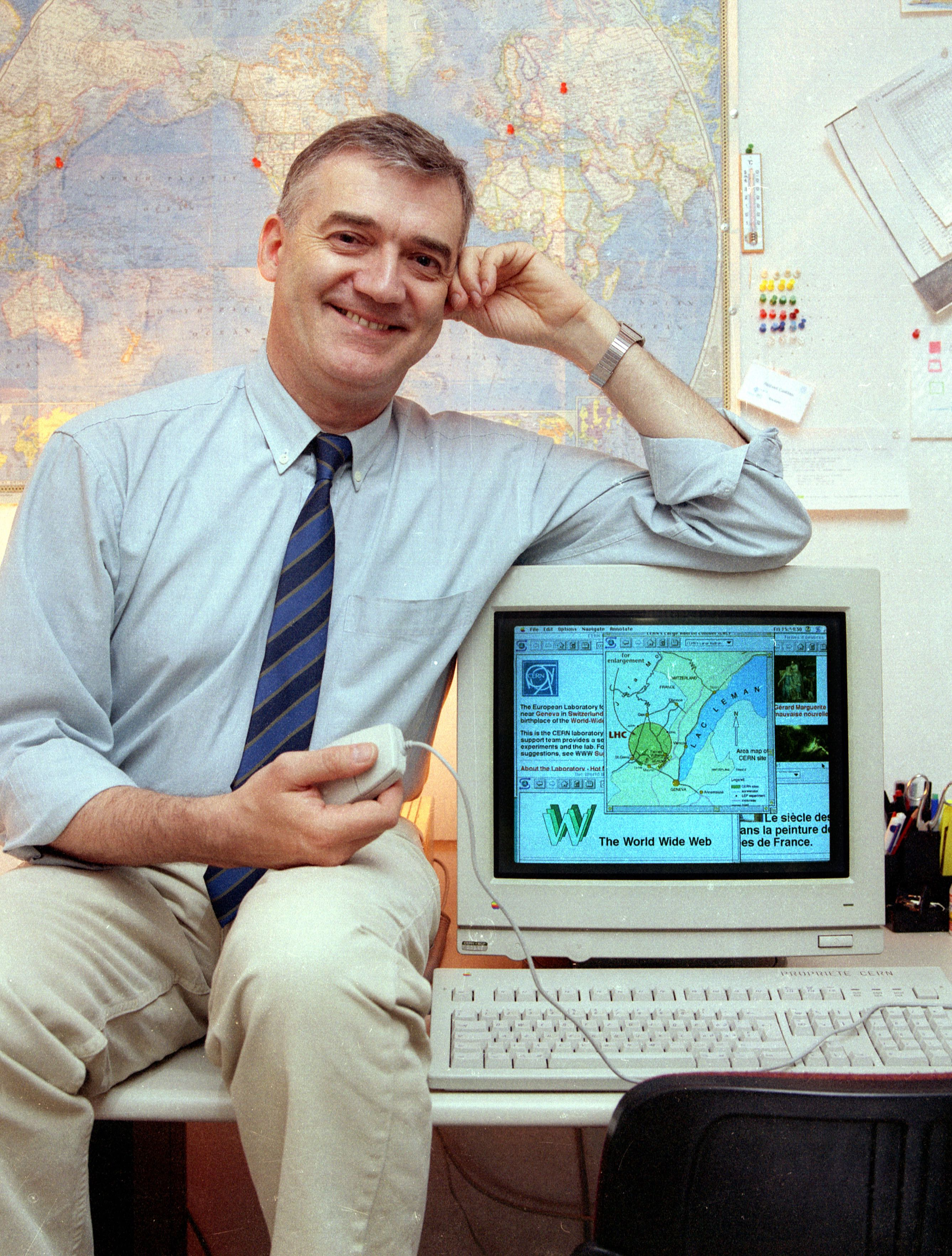
Robert Cailliau, Founder of International World Wide Web Conference

The ACM Web Conference (formerly known as International World Wide Web Conference, abbreviated as WWW) is a yearly international academic conference on the topic of the future direction of the World Wide Web. The first conference of many was held and organized by Robert Cailliau in 1994 at CERN in Geneva, Switzerland. The conference has been organized by the International World Wide Web Conference Committee (IW3C2), also founded by Robert Cailliau and colleague Joseph Hardin, every year since. In 2020, the Web Conference series became affiliated with the Association for Computing Machinery (ACM), where it is supported by ACM SIGWEB. The conference's location rotates among North America, Europe, and Asia and its events usually span a period of five days. The conference aims to provide a forum in which "key influencers, decision makers, technologists, businesses and standards bodies" can both present their ongoing work, research, and opinions as well as receive feedback from some of the most knowledgeable people in the field.

The web conference series is aimed at providing a global forum for discussion and debate in regard to the standardization of its associated technologies and the impact of said technologies on society and culture. Developers, researchers, internet users as well as commercial ventures and organizations come together at the conference to discuss the latest advancements of the Web and its evolving uses and trends, such as the development and popularization of the eTV and eBusiness. The conferences usually include a variety of events, such as tutorials and workshops, as well as the main conference and special dedications of space in memory of the history of the Web and specific notable events. The conferences are organized by the IW3C2 in collaboration with the World Wide Web Consortium (W3C), Local Organizing Committees, and Technical Program Committees.

== History ==
Robert Cailliau, a founder of the World Wide Web himself, lobbied inside CERN and at conferences like the Hypertext 1991 in San Antonio, Texas, and Hypertext 1993 in Seattle, Washington. As he came back from the conference 1993 he announced a new conference called World Wide Web Conference 1 and was actually 23 hours faster than the NCSA announced Mosaic and the Web. After founding the IW3C2 with Joseph Hardin from the NCSA they decided the next Conferences in Geneva.

== Content ==
Though the way in which its content is organized varies from year to year, the World-Wide Web Conference continues to call itself the "premiere venue for researchers, academics, businesses, and standard bodies to come together and discuss [the] latest updates and the state and evolutionary path of the Web". People from all across the world come together and submit their own new research to be peer-reviewed by some of the World Wide Web community's most knowledgeable members.

At the 2014 conference, WWW's largest program, peer-reviewed research paper presentations, fell into one of eleven categories:

- Behavioral analysis and personalization
- Content analysis
- Crowd phenomena
- Internet economics and monetization
- Security, privacy, trust and abuse
- Semantic web
- Social networks and graph analysis
- Software infrastructure, performance, scalability, and availability
- User interfaces, human factors, and smart devices
- Web mining
- Web search systems and applications

Those papers accepted were to be presented at the conference itself, and appear in the online conference proceedings published by the ACM Digital Library as well as the conference's website. Furthermore, many of these papers are submitted to other peer-reviewed journals after the conference.

In addition to presenting breakthrough research on the Web and its associated technologies, the Conference acts as a stage for developers to demonstrate and receive feedback on their ongoing work in a dedicated session. The Demo Track allows researchers and practitioners to demonstrate new systems in a dedicated session. The Developer Track is a track dedicated solely to web development, a stage upon which web developers can present "new trends and interesting ideas [as well as the] code and APIs of emerging applications, platforms, and standards."

Peer-reviewed research papers, demonstrations and developer tracks make up a large part of the conference's program, but the conference is not limited to completed research. Students studying the Web and its associated technologies can submit unfinished work for review. PhD students at any stage are invited to present their ideas at the PhD Symposium, where they can receive feedback from experienced researchers and other PhD students working in related areas. Applications and submissions are reviewed by the Symposium Program Committee, which includes experienced researchers who can advise applicants on their work. Researchers and practitioners are also invited to submit work in progress to the Poster Track, which gives presenters informal feedback from other researchers and conference attendees on ongoing research projects whose results are still preliminary.

Lastly, the Conference allows for a series of co-located workshops to its attendees dedicated to emergent Web topics. These workshops work to not only create an open dialogue amongst all researchers and practitioners of Web technologies but also a potential means of collaboration in present and future endeavors.

== List of conference editions ==
Past and future conferences include:

Year	Conference	City	Country
1994 (May)	WWW1	Geneva	Switzerland
1994 (October)	Mosaic and the Web (later WWW2)	Chicago	United States
1995 (April)	WWW3	Darmstadt	Germany
1995 (December)	WWW4	Boston	United States
1996	WWW5	Paris	France
1997	WWW6	Santa Clara	United States
1998	WWW7	Brisbane	Australia
1999	WWW8	Toronto	Canada
2000	WWW9	Amsterdam	Netherlands
2001	WWW10	Hong Kong	Hong Kong
2002	WWW2002	Honolulu, Hawaii	United States
2003	WWW2003	Budapest	Hungary
2004	WWW2004	New York	United States
2005	WWW2005	Chiba	Japan
2006	WWW2006	Edinburgh	United Kingdom
2007	WWW2007	Banff	Canada
2008	WWW2008	Beijing	China
2009	WWW2009	Madrid	Spain
2010	WWW2010	Raleigh, North Carolina	United States
2011	WWW2011	Hyderabad	India
2012	WWW2012	Lyon	France
2013	WWW2013	Rio	Brazil
2014	WWW2014	Seoul	South Korea
2015	WWW2015	Florence	Italy
2016	WWW2016	Montreal	Canada
2017	WWW2017	Perth	Australia
2018	WWW2018	Lyon	France
2019	WWW2019	San Francisco	United States
2020	WWW2020	Online (due to COVID-19 pandemic; was scheduled for Taipei)	Taiwan
2021	WWW2021	Online (due to COVID-19 pandemic; was scheduled for Ljubljana)	Slovenia
2022	WWW2022	Online (due to COVID-19 pandemic; was scheduled for Lyon)	France
2023	WWW2023	Austin	United States
2024	WWW2024	Singapore	Singapore
2025	WWW2025	Sydney	Australia
2026	WWW2026	Dubai	United Arab Emirates

== See also ==
- ACM KDD
- ACM SIGIR
- History of the World Wide Web
- ICML
- NIPS
