= Pattie Maes =

Belgian computer scientist (born 1961)

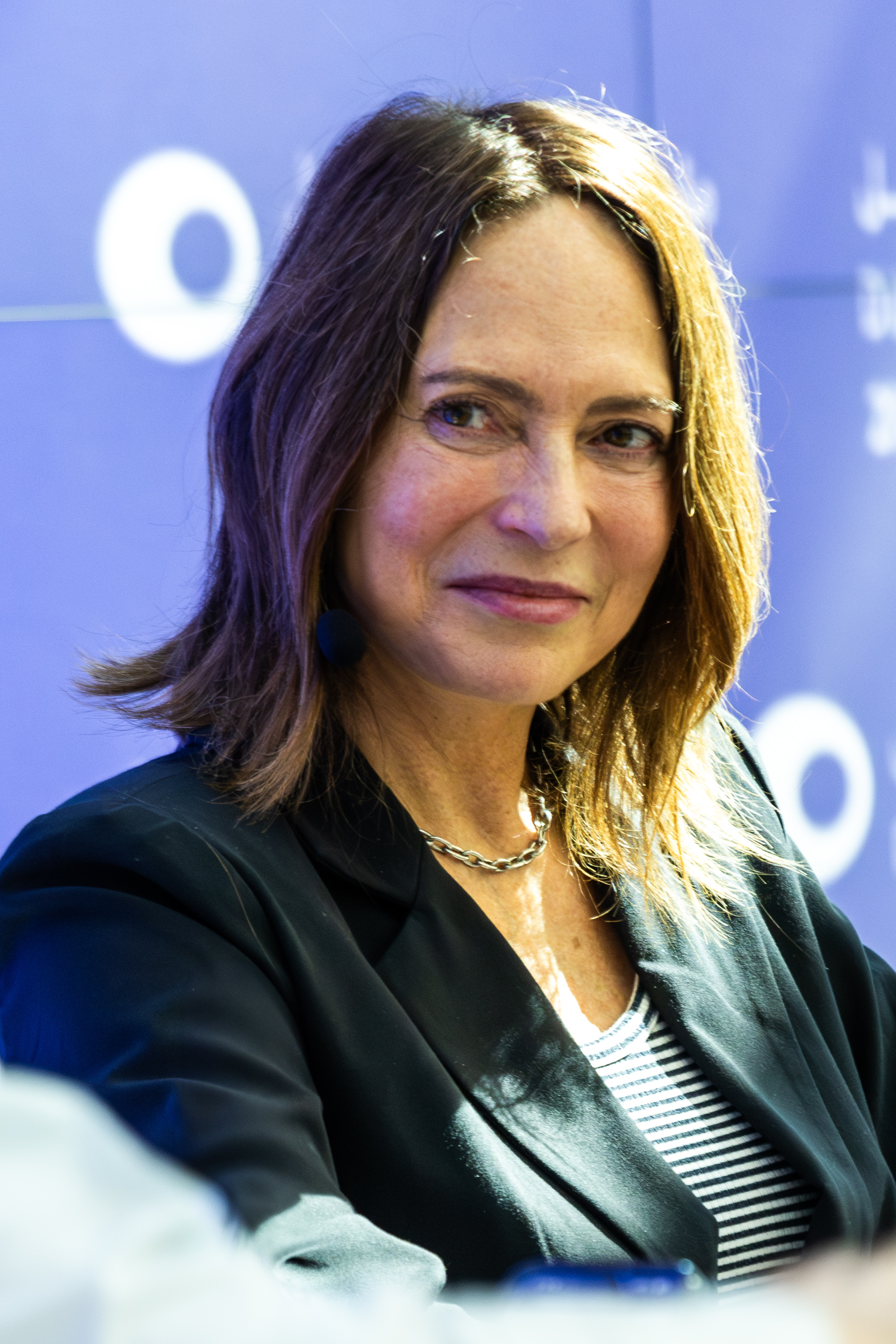
- Maes at the Dubai Future Forum, 2024
- Born: 1961 (age 64–65); Brussels, Belgium
- Citizenship: Belgium
- Education: Vrije Universiteit Brussel
- Known for: work on software agents, collaborative filtering, human–computer interfaces
- Spouse: Karl Sims
- Scientific career
- Fields: Computer Science
- Workplaces: Vrije Universiteit Brussel, MIT
- Thesis: Computational Reflection (1987)
- Doctoral advisor: Luc Steels
- Doctoral students: Marcelo Coelho; Pranav Mistry; Michael Best

Patricia "Pattie" Maes (born 1961) is a Belgian scientist. She is a professor in MIT's program in Media Arts and Sciences. She founded and directed the MIT Media Lab's Fluid Interfaces Group. Previously, she founded and ran the Software Agents group. She served for several years as both the head and associate head of the Media Lab's academic program. Prior to joining the Media Lab, Maes was a visiting professor and a research scientist at the MIT Artificial Intelligence Lab.

== Education and career ==
Maes was born in Brussels, Belgium. She holds bachelor's degree in computer science and PhD degree in AI from the Vrije Universiteit Brussel in Belgium. She did post-graduate work at MIT under Rodney Brooks and Marvin Minsky.

Maes launched the Software Agents Group at the Lab in 1991. One of the main projects from the group was the Helpful Online Music Recommendations (HOMR), later renamed “Ringo” in 1994. Users would rate a random sampling of music artists on a scale from 1 to 7. This creates a user profile. The system would look for similar users preference profiles, and email recommendations to the users of what the users might also enjoy. This was an early example of collaborative filtering recommender system. It led to Firefly, the first commercial music recommendation website, launched in 1995-10. It was launched from the Lab, since the existing companies doubted that collaborative filtering was commercially viable. It was an early example of social media.

Currently, Maes leads the Fluid Interfaces group at the Lab, which focuses on technological cognitive augmentation.

Maes' areas of expertise are human–computer interaction, intelligent interfaces and ubiquitous computing. Maes is the editor of three books, and is an editorial board member and reviewer for numerous professional journals and conferences.

Maes is married to computer graphics researcher Karl Sims.

== Honors and awards ==
She has received several awards: Newsweek magazine named her one of the "100 people for the new century"; TIME Digital selected her as a member of the Cyber-Elite (the top 50 technological pioneers of the high-tech world); the World Economic Forum honored her with the title Global Leader for Tomorrow; Ars Electronica awarded her the 1995 World Wide Web category prize; and in 2000 she was recognized with the Lifetime Achievement Award by the Massachusetts Interactive Media Council. A former model in Belgium, Maes was listed in People Magazine's annual 50 Most Beautiful People feature in 1997.

== Books ==
- Maes, Pattie, ed. (1990). Designing autonomous agents: theory and practice from biology to engineering and back. Special issues of Robotics and autonomous systems. Cambridge, Mass: MIT Press. ISBN 978-0-262-63135-8.
- Brooks, Rodney Allen; Maes, Pattie, eds. (1994). Artificial life IV: proceedings of the Fourth International Workshop on the Synthesis and Simulation of Living Systems. Complex adaptive systems. Cambridge, Mass: MIT Press. ISBN 978-0-262-52190-1.
- Huber, Jochen; Shilkrot, Roy; Maes, Pattie; Nanayakkara, Suranga, eds. (2018). Assistive Augmentation. Cognitive Science and Technology. Singapore: Springer Singapore. doi:10.1007/978-981-10-6404-3. ISBN 978-981-10-6402-9.
- ‘Floyd’ Mueller, Florian; Semertzidis, Nathan; Andres, Josh; Weigel, Martin; Nanayakkara, Suranga; Patibanda, Rakesh; Li, Zhuying; Strohmeier, Paul; Knibbe, Jarrod; Greuter, Stefan; Obrist, Marianna; Maes, Pattie; Wang, Dakuo; Wolf, Katrin; Gerber, Liz (2022). "Human–Computer Integration: Towards Integrating the Human Body with the Computational Machine". Foundations and Trends® in Human–Computer Interaction. 16 (1): 1–64. doi:10.1561/1100000086. ISSN 1551-3955.
