= USC Annenberg Press =

University press in California, US

- Parent company: University of Southern California
- Country of origin: United States
- Headquarters location: Los Angeles
- Publication types: Books, Academic journals
- Official website: annenbergpress.com

USC Annenberg Press is a university press based in the Annenberg School for Communication and Journalism at the University of Southern California. USC Annenberg Press publishes four peer-reviewed academic journals, namely the International Journal of Communication, Information Technologies & International Development, Case Studies in Strategic Communication and the Image of the Journalist in Popular Culture Journal, as well as an eBook series. As part of a stated commitment to wide dissemination of content, all articles published in USC Annenberg Press journals are available online under the Creative Commons license CC BY-ND.

== See also ==
- List of English-language book publishing companies
- List of university presses
