= Jim Woodcock =

British computer scientist

- Born: 7 June 1956 (age 70)
- Education: University of Liverpool
- Known for: CSP, UTP, Z notation
- Scientific career
- Fields: Computer science, formal methods
- Workplaces: University of Oxford; University of Kent; University of York; Aarhus University; Southwest University
- Website: www.cs.york.ac.uk/people/jim

James Charles Paul Woodcock is a British computer scientist.

Woodcock gained his PhD from the University of Liverpool. Until 2001, he was Professor of Software Engineering at the Oxford University Computing Laboratory, where he was also a Fellow of Kellogg College. He then joined the University of Kent and was later based at the University of York, where, from October 2012-2016, he was head of the Department of Computer Science, retiring in 2024.

His research interests include: strong software engineering, Grand Challenge in dependable systems evolution, unifying theories of programming, formal specification, refinement, concurrency, state-rich systems, mobile and reconfigurable processes, nanotechnology, Grand Challenge in the railway domain. He has a background in formal methods, especially the Z notation and CSP.

Woodcock worked on applying the Z notation to the IBM CICS project, helping to gain a Queen's Award for Technological Achievement, and Mondex, helping to gain the highest ITSEC classification level.

Prof. Woodcock was editor-in-chief of the Formal Aspects of Computing journal from 2007 until 2025.

In September 2024, a Festschrift Symposium was held for Woodcock at the University of York, celebrating his retirement, with an associated proceedings volume. After his official retirement from the University of York, he continued to work at Aarhus University in Denmark and Southwest University in China.

== Books ==
- Jim Woodcock and Jim Davies, Using Z: Specification, Refinement, and Proof. Prentice-Hall International Series in Computer Science, 1996. ISBN 978-0-13-948472-8.
- Jim Woodcock and Martin Loomes, Software Engineering Mathematics: Formal Methods Demystified. Kindle Edition, Taylor & Francis, 2007.
