= International Conference on Theory and Practice of Electronic Governance =

Annual conference concerning electronic governance

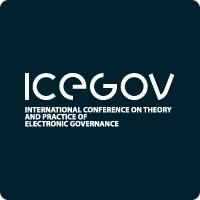
- Status: Active
- Genre: Academic
- Frequency: Annually
- Years active: 15
- Inaugurated: December 2007
- Most recent: October 2021
- Organiser: United Nations University (UNU-EGOV)
- Website: https://www.icegov.org/
- ICEGOV 2022

The International Conference on Theory and Practice of Electronic Governance (ICEGOV) is an annual conference concerning electronic governance coordinated by the United Nations University Operating Unit on Policy-Driven Electronic Governance (UNU-EGOV). ICEGOV first took place in Macau, China in 2007.

The conference promotes the interaction and cooperation between universities, research centres, governments, industries, and international organizations and aims to promote the sharing of knowledge through the publication and presentation of academic papers. From 2007 – 2018, ICEGOV received 2025 paper submissions, 1007 of which it has published, and has been attended by more than 6000 participants originating from 109 countries around the world.

== Event history ==
Overview of each ICEGOV event:

Event name	Date	Location	Theme	Papers submitted	Papers published
ICEGOV2007	10 – 13 December 2007	Macau, China	1st International Conference on Theory and Practice of Electronic Governance	159	82
ICEGOV2008	1 – 4 December 2008	Cairo, Egypt	2nd International Conference on Theory and Practice of Electronic Governance	127	92
ICEGOV2009	10 – 13 November 2009	Bogotá, Colombia	3rd International Conference on Theory and Practice of Electronic Governance	103	74
ICEGOV2010	25 – 28 October 2010	Beijing, China	4th International Conference on Theory and Practice of Electronic Governance	142	72
ICEGOV2011	26 – 28 September 2011	Tallinn, Estonia	5th International Conference on Theory and Practice of Electronic Governance	127	73
ICEGOV2012	22 – 25 October 2012	Albany, USA	6th International Conference on Theory and Practice of Electronic Governance	166	106
ICEGOV2013	22 – 25 October 2013	Seoul, Republic of Korea	Beyond 2015 - Smart Governance, Smart Development	134	81
ICEGOV2014	27 – 30 October 2014	Guimarães, Portugal	The Rise of Data Post-2015 - Empowered Citizens, Accountable Institutions	159	117
ICEGOV2016	1 – 3 March 2016	Montevideo, Uruguay	Transparent and Accountable Governance for 2030 Sustainable Development Agenda	164	89
ICEGOV2017	7 – 9 March 2017	New Delhi, India	Building Knowledge Societies: From Digital Government to Digital Empowerment	560	117
ICEGOV2018	4 – 6 April 2018	Ireland, Galway	Transforming Digital Governance for Sustainable and Resilient Societies	180	106
ICEGOV2019	3 – 5 April 2019	Melbourne, Australia	Exploring Digital Government Synergies to Foster Equality, Inclusiveness, and Productivity	171	62
ICEGOV 2020	23 - 25 September 2020	Online	Digital Governance in the Era of Disruptive Technologies and Globalisation	209	126
ICEGOV 2021	6 - 8 October 2021	Athens, Greece	Smart Digital Governance for Global Sustainability		
ICEGOV 2022	4 - 7 October 2022	Guimarães, Portugal	Digital Governance for Social, Economic, and Environmental Prosperity	TBA	TBA

== Publications ==
ICEGOV has produced several publications as a direct result of paper submissions to the conference. ICEGOV publications are indexed by Scopus, Web of Science, and DBLP – Computer Science Bibliography.

- 11 conference proceedings volumes (ACM Press), comprising more than 1000 papers written by more than 1500 authors (74% from developing countries and 26% from developed countries);
- Special Collection of e-Government Innovations in India (ACM Press, 2017);
- Special issues of Government Information Quarterly (Elsevier) with selected best papers.
