= Jim Davies (computer scientist) =

Jim Davies is Professor of Software Engineering and current Director of the Software Engineering Programme at the University of Oxford, England.

== Biography ==
Jim Davies studied mathematics at New College, Oxford, joining the Oxford University Computing Laboratory (now the Oxford University Department of Computer Science) in 1986 for a Masters' and Doctorate. After working as a researcher and lecturer in computer science, at Oxford, Reading, and Royal Holloway, University of London, he became a lecturer in software engineering at Oxford in 1995. He has led the Software Engineering Programme since 2000, and was made Professor of Software Engineering in 2006.

Davies is an expert in formal methods, including Communicating Sequential Processes (CSP) and the Z notation.

== Books ==
- Jim Davies, Specification and Proof in Real Time CSP. Cambridge University Press, 1993. ISBN 978-0-521-45055-3.
- Jim Woodcock and Jim Davies, Using Z: Specification, Refinement, and Proof. Prentice-Hall International Series in Computer Science, 1996. ISBN 978-0-13-948472-8.
- Jim Davies, Bill Roscoe, and Jim Woodcock, Millennial Perspectives in Computer Science: Proceedings of the 1999 Oxford-Microsoft Symposium in Honour of Sir Tony Hoare. Palgrave Macmillan, Cornerstones of Computing, 2000. ISBN 978-0-333-92230-9.
