= Duration calculus =

Duration calculus (DC) is an interval logic for real-time systems. It was originally developed by Zhou Chaochen with the help of Anders P. Ravn and C. A. R. Hoare on the European ESPRIT Basic Research Action (BRA) ProCoS project on Provably Correct Systems.

Duration calculus is mainly useful at the requirements level of the software development process for real-time systems. Some tools are available (e.g., DCVALID, IDLVALID, etc.). Subsets of duration calculus have been studied (e.g., using discrete time rather than continuous time). Duration calculus is especially espoused by UNU-IIST in Macau and the Tata Institute of Fundamental Research in Mumbai, which are major centres of excellence for the approach.

== See also ==
- Interval temporal logic (ITL)
- Temporal logic
- Temporal logic of actions (TLA)
- Modal logic
