= Michael L. Best =

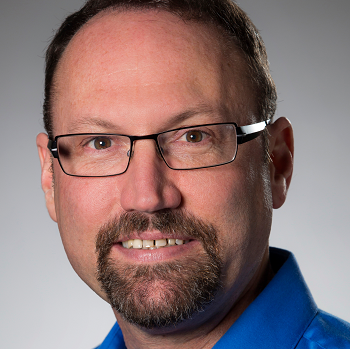
- Dr. Micahel L. Best.
- Education: MIT Media Lab,
- Scientific career
- Fields: Computer Science, ICT4D, ICT sustainibility,
- Workplaces: Georgia Tech,
- Doctoral advisor: Pattie Maes

Michael L. Best is an American computer scientist and international development specialist. He is professor at the Georgia Institute of Technology where he holds a joint appointment with the Sam Nunn School of International Affairs and the School of Interactive Computing. He is Executive Director of the Institute for People and Technology(IPaT) and Director of the Technologies and International Development Lab. Best served as founding director of the United Nations University Institute on Computing and Society established in 2015.

Working in the areas of ICT4D, he is co-founder and editor-in-chief emeritus of journal Information Technologies and International Development and leads the "Global Computing" column for Communications of the ACM. He has published on various topics such as formative work in ICT sustainability, rural access, and ICTs for peacebuilding in conflict stressed environments.

His work has done much to promote ICT4D as an academic discipline having founded the area's most significant journal (ITID) and helped to lead its largest conference (ICTD).

== Early life and education ==
Best was born in Los Angeles, California. He attended UCLA for undergraduate studies in computer science and engineering, where for his senior thesis he developed, on a Connection Machine, a massively parallel algorithm for the graph coloring problem. After graduating with a BS in 1989 he joined Thinking Machines Corp in Cambridge, Massachusetts, where he worked on various projects, including parallel programming languages, message passing I/O, and network simulation for the CM 5 supercomputer.

Best attended graduate school at the MIT Media Lab, receiving an MS under the supervision of Ken Haase. His PhD work, supervised by Pattie Maes, applied evolutionary theory to problems in text analysis and retrieval.

== ICT4D and Georgia Tech ==
Upon graduating with his PhD in 2000, Best joined the Media Lab as a research scientist and the Center for International Development at Harvard University as a research fellow. He went on to direct the eDevelopment Group at the MIT Media Lab as well as Media Lab Asia, at the time an MIT Media Lab collaborative research initiative in India. He has served as fellow or faculty associate of the Berkman Center for Internet and Society at Harvard University since 2003.

In 2008, Best joined the Georgia Institute of Technology as an assistant professor. In 2011 he received tenure and was promoted to associate professor and then to full professor. He directs the Technologies and International Development Lab (TID Lab), where he has supervised many global projects, in particular in Africa and South Asia. The TID Lab is a multi-disciplinary research collaborative combining social and computer sciences with policy and design. At Georgia Tech he has received substantial recognition for his work including the Ivan Allen Faculty Legacy Award (2009), People & Technology Award (2011), and Stephen A. Denning Faculty Award for Global Engagement (2014). His work has been supported by a variety of sponsors including The MacArthur Foundation, USAID, and Microsoft. He has published 100 papers in journals, conferences, or books.

Best has made numerous contributions towards establishing ICT4D as an academic discipline. He is the founding editor-in-chief, with Ernest J. Wilson III, of the field's highest-rated journal, Information Technologies and International Development (ITID). In addition he is one of the early organizers of the area's major conference, the International Conference on Information and Communication Technologies and Development, having served as its general chair in 2012. He is founder and lead of the Global Computing column for Communications of the ACM.
