= Information Technologies and International Development =

Information Technologies & International Development
- Discipline: Communication, Media Studies, International Development
- Language: English
- Edited by: François Bar, Michael Best, Kentaro Toyama, Ernest J. Wilson III

Publication details
- History: 2003--present
- Publisher: USC Annenberg Press (USA)
- Frequency: Quarterly
- License: Creative Commons by-nc-sa

Standard abbreviations
- ISO 4: Inf. Technol. Int. Dev.

Indexing
- ISSN: 1544-7529

Links
- Journal homepage

Information Technologies & International Development (ITID) is an open access print and online peer-reviewed academic journal covering studies on communication and international development, published quarterly by the USC Annenberg Press (University of Southern California). The journal was established in 2003 and is indexed by EBSCOhost, ProQuest, Genamics Journal Seek, the International Development Informatics Association, and the International Network for Post Graduate Students in the Area of ICT4D (IPID).

ITID focuses on the study of the relationship between information and communication technologies and economic and social development, inviting submissions from engineers, social scientists, policy makers, development specialists, and scholars of diverse academic backgrounds. According to a recent study, ITID is ranked as the top journal for research impact in the Information and communication technologies for development (ICT4D) field.
