= Web for Schools =

The Web for Schools project was funded by the European Commission as part of its ESPRIT programme and ran from 1996-03-01 to 1998-02-28. It was a transformative project at the basis of the uptake of the World Wide Web in European schools.

The initial inspiration came from Robert Cailliau, a Belgian computer scientist who developed together with Tim Berners-Lee the World Wide Web. The project trained over 700 school teachers from 170 schools across Europe in basic HTML using a simple text editor, the only affordable web creation tool at that time. Following that, teachers created more than 70 international collaborative educational projects that resulted in an exponential growth in Europe of teacher communities and educational activities using the World Wide Web.
