= Acta Informatica =

- Discipline: Informatics
- Language: English
- Edited by: Henning Fernau

Publication details
- History: 1971–present
- Publisher: Springer (Germany)
- Frequency: 4/year
- Impact factor: 0.871 (2021)

Standard abbreviations
- ISO 4: Acta Inform.

Indexing
- ISSN: 0001-5903 (print); 1432-0525 (web)
- OCLC no.: 39965310

Links
- Journal homepage; Online access

Acta Informatica is a peer-reviewed scientific journal, publishing original research papers in computer science.

The journal is mainly known for publications in theoretical computer science. One of the two 1988 papers that were awarded the Gödel Prize in 1995 has appeared in this journal.

The editor-in-chief is Henning Fernau of Universität Trier. According to the Journal Citation Reports, the journal had a 2021 impact factor of 0.871.
