= Interval temporal logic =

Interval temporal logic (also interval logic) is a temporal logic for representing both propositional and first-order logical reasoning about periods of time that is capable of handling both sequential and parallel composition. Instead of dealing with infinite sequences of state, interval temporal logics deal with finite sequences.

Interval temporal logic finds application in computer science, artificial intelligence and linguistics. First-order interval temporal logic was initially developed in the 1980s for the specification and verification of hardware protocols. Interval temporal logic (ITL) is a specific form of temporal logic, originally developed by Ben Moszkowski for his thesis at Stanford University. It is useful in the formal description of hardware and software for computer-based systems. Tools are available to aid in this process. Tempura provides an executable ITL framework. Compositionality is a significant issue and consideration in the design of ITL.

Notable derivatives of interval temporal logic are graphical interval logic, signed interval logic and future interval logic.

== See also ==
- Duration calculus
- Formal methods
- Temporal logic of actions
