= He Jifeng =

Chinese computer scientist

- 何积丰
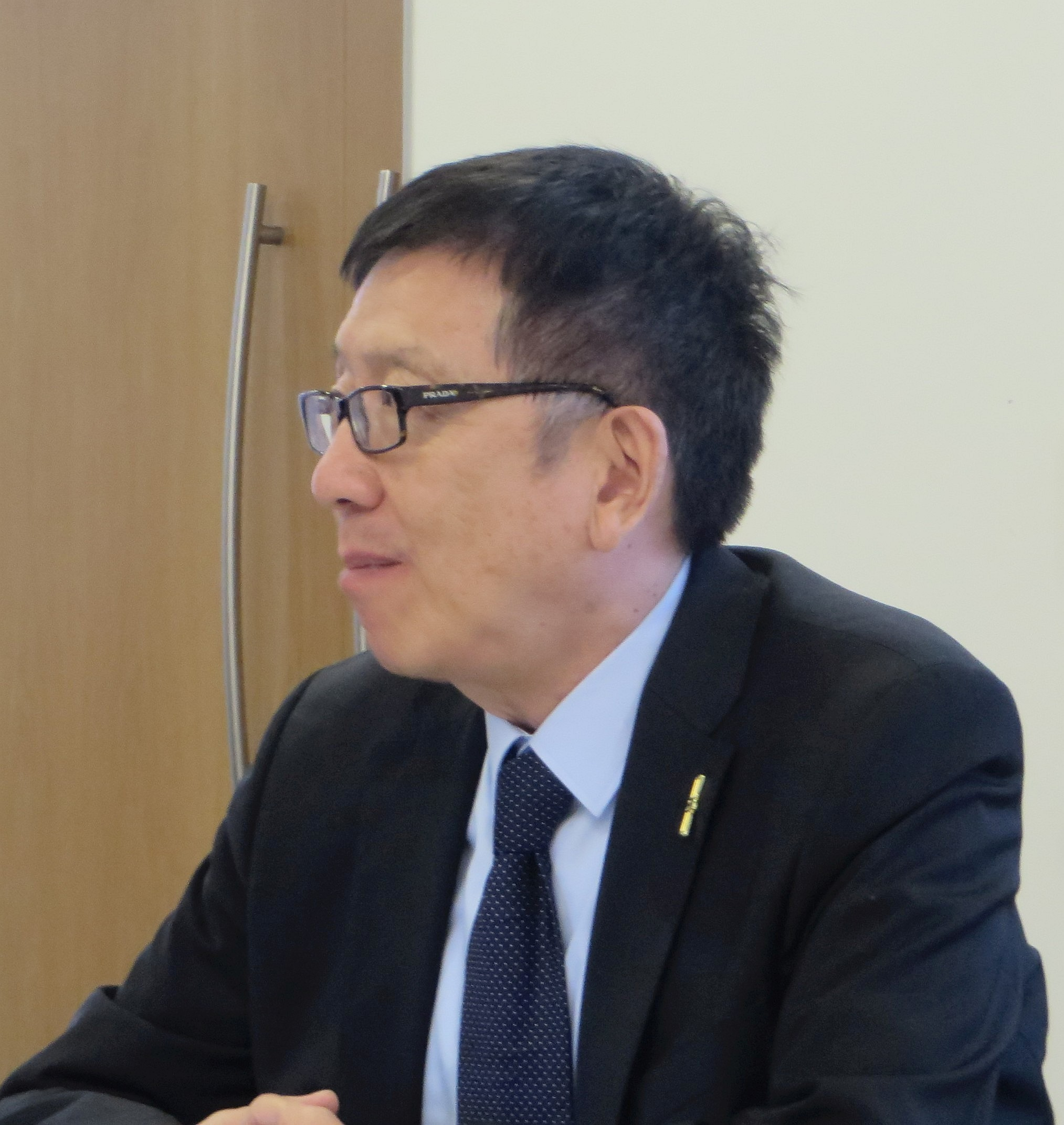
- Prof. Jifeng He speaking at the BCS London office in 2018
- Born: August 1943 (age 83); Shanghai, China
- Education: Fudan University
- Known for: Unifying Theories of Programming
- Scientific career
- Fields: Computer science, formal methods
- Workplaces: East China Normal University; University of Oxford; Shanghai Jiao Tong University; United Nations University; Tongji University
- Website: www.jfai-sh.com

He Jifeng (simplified Chinese: 何积丰; traditional Chinese: 何積豐; pinyin: Hé Jīfēng, born August 1943) is a Chinese computer scientist.

== Education ==
He Jifeng graduated from the mathematics department of Fudan University in 1965. From 1965 to 1985, he was an instructor at East China Normal University. During 1980–81, he was a visiting scholar at Stanford University and the University of San Francisco in California, United States.

From 1984 to 1998, He Jifeng was a senior research fellow at the Programming Research Group in the Oxford University Computing Laboratory (now the Oxford University Department of Computer Science). He worked extensively on formal aspects of computing science. In particular, he worked with Prof. Sir Tony Hoare, latterly on Unifying Theories of Programming, resulting in a book of that name.

Since 1986, He Jifeng has been professor of computer science at East China Normal University in Shanghai. In 1996, he also became professor of computer science at Shanghai Jiao Tong University.

In 1998, he became a senior research fellow at the International Institute for Software Technology (UNU-IIST), United Nations University, based in Macau. He moved back to Shanghai in 2005.

He Jifeng's research interests include sound methods for the specification of computer systems, communications, applications, standards, and techniques for designing and implementing those specifications in software and/or hardware with high reliability.

In 2005, he was elected to the Chinese Academy of Sciences. In 2013, his 70th birthday was celebrated at East China Normal University with an international three-day Festschrift in association with the International Conference on Theoretical Aspects of Computing (ICTAC). Ten years later in 2023, his 80th birthday was celebrated at the Shanghai Science Hall with a hybrid international two-day Festschrift Symposium. Since 2019, he has been a distinguished professor at Tongji University in Shanghai.

== Books ==
He Jifeng has written a number of computer science books, including:

- He Jifeng, Provably Correct Systems: Modelling of Communication Languages and Design of Optimized Compilers. McGraw-Hill International Series in Software, 1995. ISBN 978-0-07-709052-4.
- C.A.R. Hoare and He Jifeng, Unified Theories of Programming. Prentice Hall International Series in Computer Science, 1998. ISBN 978-0-13-458761-5.
- Zhiming Liu and He Jifeng, Mathematical Frameworks for Component Software: Models for Analysis and Synthesis. World Scientific Publishing Company, Series on Component-Based Software Development, 2007. ISBN 978-981-270-017-9.
