= European Strategic Programme on Research in Information Technology =

Series of information technology R&D programmes of the EC/EU

European Strategic Programme on Research in Information Technology (ESPRIT) was a series of integrated programmes of information technology research and development projects and industrial technology transfer measures. It was a European Union initiative managed by the Directorate General for Industry (DG III) of the European Commission.

== Programmes ==
Five ESPRIT programmes (ESPRIT 0 to ESPRIT 4) ran consecutively from 1983 to 1998. ESPRIT 4 was succeeded by the Information Society Technologies (IST) programme in 1999.

== Projects and products ==
Some of the projects and products supported by ESPRIT were:

- AGENT: A project led by IGN-France aiming at developing an operational automated map generalisation software based on multi-agent system paradigm.
- BBC Domesday Project: A partnership between Acorn Computers Ltd, Philips, Logica, and the BBC with some funding from the European Commission's ESPRIT programme, to mark the 900th anniversary of the original Domesday Book, an 11th-century census of England. It is frequently cited as an example of digital obsolescence on account of the physical medium used for data storage.
- CGAL, the Computational Geometry Algorithms Library (CGAL) is a software library that aims to provide easy access to efficient and reliable algorithms in computational geometry. While primarily written in C++, Python bindings are also available. The original funding for the project came from the ESPRIT project.
- Eurocoop & Eurocode: ESPRIT III projects to develop systems for supporting distributed collaborative working.
- ISO 14649 (1999 onward): A standard for STEP-NC for CNC control developed by ESPRIT and Intelligent Manufacturing System.
- Open Document Architecture: A free and open international standard document file format maintained by the ITU-T to replace all proprietary document file formats. In 1985, ESPRIT financed a pilot implementation of the ODA concept, involving, among others, Bull corporation, Olivetti, ICL, and Siemens AG.
- Paradise: A sub-project of the ESPRIT I project, COSINE which established a pan-European computer-based network infrastructure that enabled research workers to communicate with each other using OSI. Paradise implemented a distributed X.500 directory across the academic community.
- Password: Part of the ESPRIT III VALUE project, developed secure applications based on the X.509 standard for use in the academic community.
- ProCoS ("Provably Correct Systems"): ESPIRT II ProCoS BRA (Basic Research Action) Project (1989–1991), ProCoS II Project (1992–1995), and ProCoS-WG Working Group (1994–1997).
- RAISE, Rigorous Approach to Industrial Software Engineering, was developed as part of the European ESPRIT II LaCoS project in the 1990s, led by Dines Bjørner.
- REDO Project (1989–1992) on software maintenance, under ESPRIT II.
- REMORA methodology is an event-driven approach for designing information systems, developed by Colette Rolland. This methodology integrates behavioral and temporal aspects with concepts for modelling the structural aspects of an information system. In the ESPRIT I project TODOS, which has led to the development of an integrated environment for the design of office information systems (OISs),
- SAMPA: The Speech Assessment Methods Phonetic Alphabet (SAMPA) is a computer-readable phonetic script originally developed in the late 1980s.
- SCOPES: The Systematic Concurrent design of Products, Equipment, and Control Systems project was a 3-year project launched in July 1992, with the aim of specifying integrated computer-aided (CAD) tools for design and control of flexible assembly lines.
- SIP (Advanced Algorithms and Architectures for Speech and Image Processing), a partnership between Thomson-CSF, AEG, CSELT, and ENSPS (ESPRIT P26), to develop the algorithmic and architectural techniques required for recognizing and understanding spoken or visual signals and to demonstrate these techniques in suitable applications.
- StatLog: "ESPRIT project 5170. Comparative testing and evaluation of statistical and logical learning algorithms on large-scale applications to classification, prediction and control".
- SUNDIAL (Speech UNderstanding DIALgue) started in September 1988 with Logica Ltd. as prime contractor, together with Erlangen University, CSELT, Daimler-Benz, Capgemini, Politecnico di Torino. Followed the Esprit P.26 to implement and evaluate dialogue systems to be used in the telephone industry. The final results were 4 prototypes in 4 languages, involving speech and understanding technologies, and some criteria for evaluation were also reported.
- Transputers: "ESPRIT Project P1085" to develop a high-performance multi-processor computer and a package of software applications to demonstrate its performance.
- Web for Schools: an ESPRIT IV project that introduced the World Wide Web in secondary schools in Europe. Teachers created more than 70 international collaborative educational projects that resulted in an exponential growth of teacher communities and educational activities using the World Wide Web
