= United Nations University Institute in Macau =

U.N. University Research Training Centre based in Macau, China

Coordinates: 22°11′45″N 113°32′55.75″E

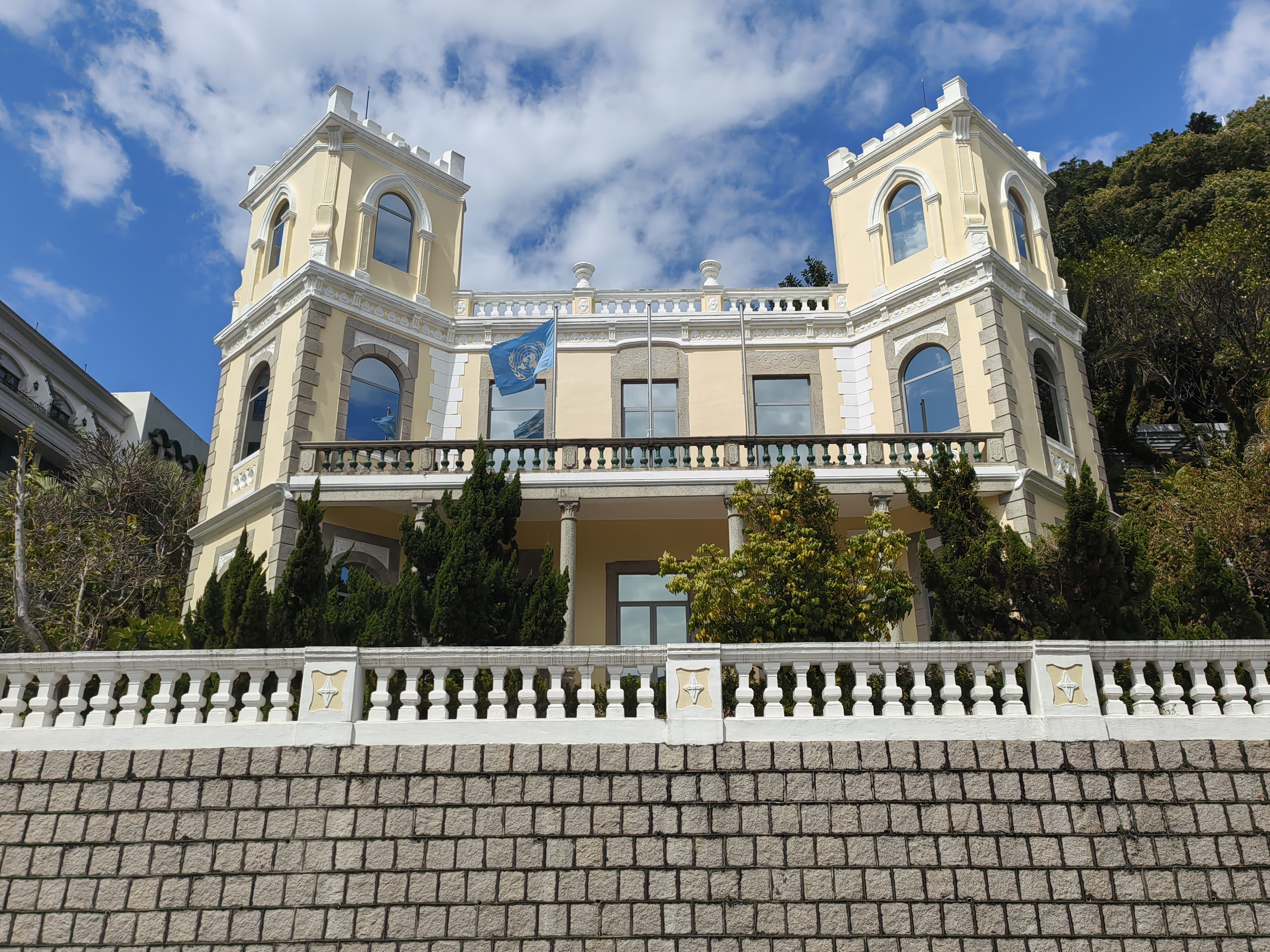
- The building of United Nations University Institute in Macau
- Type: Research center and think tank
- Established: 1992; 34 years ago
- Parent institution: United Nations
- Location: Macau, China
- Website: unu.edu/macau

The United Nations University Institute in Macau, formerly the United Nations University International Institute for Software Technology (UNU-IIST; Chinese: 聯合國大學國際軟件技術研究所; Portuguese: Universidade das Nações Unidas – Instituto Internacional de Tecnologia do Software) and then United Nations University Institute on Computing and Society (UNU-CS; Chinese: 聯合國大學計算與社會研究所), is a United Nations University global think tank conducting research and training on digital technologies for sustainable development, encouraging data-driven and evidence-based actions and policies to achieve the Sustainable Development Goals. UNU-Macau is located in Macau, China.

== History ==
During 1987–1989, United Nations University conducted two studies regarding the need for a research and training centre for computing in the developing nations. The studies led to the decision of the Council of the UNU to establish in Macau the United Nations University International Institute for Software Technology (UNU-IIST), which was founded on 12 March 1991 and opened its door in July 1992. UNU-IIST was created following the agreement between the UN, the governments of Macau, Portugal, and China.

The Macau authorities also supplied the institute with its office premises, located in a heritage building Casa Silva Mendes, and subsidize fellow accommodation.

As part of the United Nations, the institute was to address the pressing global problems of human survival, development and welfare by international co-operation, research and advanced training in software technology.

After the Transfer of sovereignty over Macau, UNU-IIST lost some level of visibility.

=== United Nations University Institute on Computing and Society ===
Emblem of the United Nations

United Nations University Institute in Macau
- UNU-CS logo
- Traditional Chinese: 聯合國大學澳門研究所
- Simplified Chinese: 联合国大学澳门研究所
Transcriptions
Standard Mandarin
- Hanyu Pinyin: Liánhéguó Dàxué Àomén Yánjiūsuǒ
Yue: Cantonese
- Jyutping: lyun4 hap6 gwok3 daai6 hok6 ou3 mun2 jin4 gau3 so2

Eventually, in 2015, UNU decided to evolve the former IIST into a new Institute on Computing and Society (UNU-CS). UNU-CS intended to assist the United Nations to achieve its agenda by working as a bridge between the UN and the international academic and public policy communities, training the next generation of interdisciplinary scientists in computing, social sciences, and design for international development. The UNU-CS director Professor Michael L. Best was in charge of building the new succeeding institute "from scratch".

== Goal ==
The goal of UNU-CS was "to nurture the next generation of computer and social scientists with the ability to participate in, shape and benefit from the rapid development of the global information society."

A research start-up, UNU-CS aims to do the following:

- Lead in investigating and inventing human-centred information and communication technologies addressing some of the priorities central to the United Nations such as: sustainability, development, governance, peace and security, human rights and human dignity.
- Impact policymakers, within the UN system and beyond, through actionable knowledge and thought-leadership.
- Nurture the next generation of inter-disciplinary computing, information and social scientists; and engineers in developing countries.
- Embrace the enormous dynamism of the city of Macau and Pearl River Delta region while still working globally.

According to its founding director, Professor Michael Best, his goal is "to raise the profile of the Institute as a centre of excellence in the UN system effectively responding to the needs of the developing world in this crucially important area".

== Administration ==
The current director is Dr. Jingbo Huang.

Former directors

- Prof. Michael L. Best (2015–2018)
- Prof. Peter Haddawy (2010–2015)
- Dr. Mike Reed (2005–2010)
- Dr. Chris Georges (2003–2005) (Director a.i)
- Prof. Armando Haeberer (2002–2003)
- Prof. Zhou Chaochen (1997–2002)
- Prof. Dines Bjorner (1992–1997)

== Laboratories ==
As of 2015, three "action-oriented research labs" were being developed:

- Digital Peace Lab: ICTs for peacebuilding and to support human security, respond to crises, and mitigate human displacement.
- Gender Tech Lab: ICTs that promote women's empowerment and enable sustainable community led development.
- Small Data Lab: ICTs that create actionable knowledge from local data, empower citizens with data they trust, and improve global datasets with local data.

== Center for Electronic Governance ==
The Center for Electronic Governance at UNU-IIST is an International Center of Excellence on research and practice in Electronic Governance. Established in 2007, the center has been built upon the contribution of UNU-IIST to the eMacao Project (2004–2006) and eMacao Program (2007-now), a collaborative initiative to build and utilize a foundation for Electronic Government in Macao SAR. Since 2010, it has become an official programme of UNU-IIST.

The mission of the Center for Electronic Governance at UNU-IIST is to support governments in developing countries in strategic use of technology to transform the working of public organizations and their relationships with citizens, businesses, civil society, and with one another.

Activities at the Center include applied and policy research, capacity building and various forms of development – strategy development, software development, institutional development and development of communities of practice.

The center, since July 2014, became United Nations University Operating Unit on Policy-Driven Electronic Governance (UNU-EGOV), following the appointment and relocation from Macau to Guimarães of former members of the center.

=== Teaching ===
The Center regularly organizes and conducts schools, seminars, lectures and presentations for government leaders, managers, researchers, educators, etc. on various aspects of Electronic Governance. Various courses and presentation materials from these events are available.

=== Conferences ===
The center established in 2007 and since then leads the organization of a series of International Conferences on Electronic Governance (ICEGOV), with the first four editions in Macau, Cairo, Bogotá, and Beijing.

== See also ==
- International Conference on Theory and Practice of Electronic Governance
- Prof. He Jifeng, former Senior Research Fellow
