= Summer School Marktoberdorf =

The International Summer School Marktoberdorf is an annual two-week summer school for international computer science and mathematics postgraduate students and other young researchers, held annually since 1970 in Marktoberdorf, near Munich in southern Germany. Students are accommodated in the boarding house of a local high school, Gymnasium Marktoberdorf. Proceedings are published when appropriate.

== Status ==
This is a summer school for theoretical computer science researchers, with some directors/co-directors who are Turing Award winners (the nearest equivalent to the Nobel Prize in computer science).

The summer school is supported as an Advanced Study Institute of the NATO Science for Peace and Security Program. It is administered by the Faculty of Informatics at the Technical University of Munich.

== Directors ==
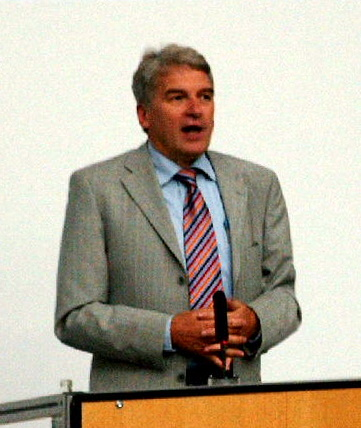
Prof. Dr Manfred Broy, a leading director of the School

Past academic directors and co-directors include:

- Manfred Broy
- Robert Lee Constable
- Javier Esparza
- Orna Grumberg
- David Harel
- Tony Hoare*
- Orna Kupferman
- Tobias Nipkow
- Doron Peled
- Amir Pnueli*
- Alexander Pretschner
- Peter Müller
- Shmuel Sagiv
- Helmut Schwichtenberg
- Helmut Seidl
- Stanley S. Wainer

^{*} Turing Award winners.
