= Ostallgäu (electoral district) =

Federal electoral district of Germany

257 Ostallgäu
- Electoral district for the Bundestag
- Ostallgäu in 2025
- State: Bavaria
- Population: 339,800 (2019)
- Electorate: 161,049 (2025)
- Major settlements: Kaufbeuren; Marktoberdorf; Füssen
- Area: 2,328.1 km^{2}

Current electoral district
- Created: 1949
- Party: CSU
- Member: Stephan Stracke
- Elected: 2009, 2013, 2017, 2021, 2025

Ostallgäu is an electoral constituency (German: Wahlkreis) represented in the Bundestag. It elects one member via first-past-the-post voting. Under the current constituency numbering system, it is designated as constituency 257. It is located in southwestern Bavaria, comprising the city of Kaufbeuren, the Ostallgäu district, and southern parts of the Landkreis Augsburg district.

Ostallgäu was created for the inaugural 1949 federal election. Since 2009, it has been represented by Stephan Stracke of the Christian Social Union (CSU).

== Geography ==
Ostallgäu is located in southwestern Bavaria. As of the 2025 federal election, it comprises the independent city of Kaufbeuren, the Ostallgäu district, and the municipality of Graben and Verwaltungsgemeinschaften of Großaitingen, Langerringen, and Lechfeld from the Landkreis Augsburg district.

== History ==
Ostallgäu was created in 1949, then known as Kaufbeuren. It acquired its current name in the 1976 election. In the 1949 election, it was Bavaria constituency 45 in the numbering system. In the 1953 through 1961 elections, it was number 240. In the 1965 through 1972 elections, it was number 242. In the 1976 through 1998 elections, it was number 243. In the 2002 and 2005 elections, it was number 258. Since the 2009 election, it has been number 257.

Originally, the constituency comprised the independent city of Kaufbeuren and the districts of Landkreis Kaufbeuren, Füssen, Marktoberdorf, and Schwabmünchen. In the 1965 through 1972 elections, it comprised the independent cities of Kaufbeuren and Memmingen and the districts of Landkreis Kaufbeuren, Landkreis Memmingen, Mindelheim, and Marktoberdorf. In the 1976 through 1990 elections, it comprised the cities of Kaufbeuren and Memmingen and the districts of Ostallgäu and Unterallgäu. In 1994, several municipalities of Untergallgäu were transferred out of the constituency. It was reconfigured to its current borders ahead of the 2025 election.

Election	No.	Name	Borders
1949	45	Kaufbeuren	Kaufbeuren city; Landkreis Kaufbeuren district; Füssen district; Marktoberdorf district; Schwabmünchen district
1953	240	Kaufbeuren	Kaufbeuren city; Landkreis Kaufbeuren district; Füssen district; Marktoberdorf district; Schwabmünchen district
1957	240	Kaufbeuren	Kaufbeuren city; Landkreis Kaufbeuren district; Füssen district; Marktoberdorf district; Schwabmünchen district
1961	240	Kaufbeuren	Kaufbeuren city; Landkreis Kaufbeuren district; Füssen district; Marktoberdorf district; Schwabmünchen district
1965	242	Kaufbeuren	Kaufbeuren city; Memmingen city; Landkreis Kaufbeuren district; Landkreis Memmingen district; Mindelheim district; Marktoberdorf district
1969	242	Kaufbeuren	Kaufbeuren city; Memmingen city; Landkreis Kaufbeuren district; Landkreis Memmingen district; Mindelheim district; Marktoberdorf district
1972	242	Kaufbeuren	Kaufbeuren city; Memmingen city; Landkreis Kaufbeuren district; Landkreis Memmingen district; Mindelheim district; Marktoberdorf district
1976	243	Ostallgäu	Kaufbeuren city; Memmingen city; Ostallgäu district; Unterallgäu district
1980	243	Ostallgäu	Kaufbeuren city; Memmingen city; Ostallgäu district; Unterallgäu district
1983	243	Ostallgäu	Kaufbeuren city; Memmingen city; Ostallgäu district; Unterallgäu district
1987	243	Ostallgäu	Kaufbeuren city; Memmingen city; Ostallgäu district; Unterallgäu district
1990	243	Ostallgäu	Kaufbeuren city; Memmingen city; Ostallgäu district; Unterallgäu district
1994	243	Ostallgäu	Kaufbeuren city; Memmingen city; Ostallgäu district; Unterallgäu district (excluding Babenhausen, Boos, Erkheim, and Pfaffenhausen Verwaltungsgemeinschaften)
1998	243	Ostallgäu	Kaufbeuren city; Memmingen city; Ostallgäu district; Unterallgäu district (excluding Babenhausen, Boos, Erkheim, and Pfaffenhausen Verwaltungsgemeinschaften)
2002	258	Ostallgäu	Kaufbeuren city; Memmingen city; Ostallgäu district; Unterallgäu district (excluding Babenhausen, Boos, Erkheim, and Pfaffenhausen Verwaltungsgemeinschaften)
2005	258	Ostallgäu	Kaufbeuren city; Memmingen city; Ostallgäu district; Unterallgäu district (excluding Babenhausen, Boos, Erkheim, and Pfaffenhausen Verwaltungsgemeinschaften)
2009	257	Ostallgäu	Kaufbeuren city; Memmingen city; Ostallgäu district; Unterallgäu district (excluding Babenhausen, Boos, Erkheim, and Pfaffenhausen Verwaltungsgemeinschaften)
2013	257	Ostallgäu	Kaufbeuren city; Memmingen city; Ostallgäu district; Unterallgäu district (excluding Babenhausen, Boos, Erkheim, and Pfaffenhausen Verwaltungsgemeinschaften)
2017	257	Ostallgäu	Kaufbeuren city; Memmingen city; Ostallgäu district; Unterallgäu district (excluding Babenhausen, Boos, Erkheim, and Pfaffenhausen Verwaltungsgemeinschaften)
2021	257	Ostallgäu	Kaufbeuren city; Memmingen city; Ostallgäu district; Unterallgäu district (excluding Babenhausen, Boos, Erkheim, and Pfaffenhausen Verwaltungsgemeinschaften)
2025	257	Ostallgäu	Kaufbeuren city; Ostallgäu district; Landkreis Augsburg district (only Graben municipality and Großaitingen, Langerringen, and Lechfeld Verwaltungsgemeinschaften)

== Members ==
Like most constituencies in rural Bavaria, it is an CSU safe seat, the party holding the seat continuously since its creation. It was first represented by Josef Spies from 1949 to 1965, followed by Hans August Lücker from 1965 to 1980. Kurt Rossmanith was representative from 1980 to 2009, a total of eight consecutive terms. Stephan Stracke was elected in 2009, and re-elected in 2013, 2017, 2021, and 2025.

Election	Member	Party	%
1949	Josef Spies	CSU	31.3
1953	Josef Spies	CSU	57.7
1957	Josef Spies	CSU	62.6
1961	Josef Spies	CSU	60.5
1965	Hans August Lücker	CSU	64.0
1969	Hans August Lücker	CSU	64.0
1972	Hans August Lücker	CSU	65.7
1976	Hans August Lücker	CSU	69.9
1980	Kurt Rossmanith	CSU	68.6
1983	Kurt Rossmanith	CSU	71.5
1987	Kurt Rossmanith	CSU	66.8
1990	Kurt Rossmanith	CSU	60.8
1994	Kurt Rossmanith	CSU	60.2
1998	Kurt Rossmanith	CSU	56.9
2002	Kurt Rossmanith	CSU	64.9
2005	Kurt Rossmanith	CSU	60.9
2009	Stephan Stracke	CSU	51.1
2013	Stephan Stracke	CSU	59.8
2017	Stephan Stracke	CSU	49.2
2021	Stephan Stracke	CSU	38.8
2025	Stephan Stracke	CSU	45.5

== Election results ==
=== 2025 election ===
Federal election (2025): Ostallgäu
Notes:	Blue background denotes the winner of the electorate vote. Pink background denotes a candidate elected from their party list. Yellow background denotes an electorate win by a list member, or other incumbent. A ✓ or ✗ denotes status of any incumbent, win or lose respectively.						
Party	Candidate	Votes	%	±%	Party votes	%	±%
CSU	✓ Stephan Stracke	61,893	45.5	▲5.3	54,701	40.1	▲7.7
AfD	Wolfgang Bernd Dröse	26,565	19.5	▲10.4	27,434	20.1	▲10.9
Greens	Maria Ingrid Wißmiller	14,112	10.4	▼1.9	13,673	10.0	▼2.6
SPD	Dr. Regina Michaela Renner	13,576	10.0	▼1.9	12,772	9.4	▼6.3
FW	Susen Knabner	10,138	7.5	▼1.6	7,506	5.5	▼3.6
Left	Ralf Lehnhard	6,099	4.5	▲0.7	6,460	4.7	▲2.2
FDP	Marcus Prost	3,543	2.6	▼4.6	5,211	3.8	▼6.8
BSW					4,278	3.1	
APT					1,010	0.7	▼0.3
Volt					779	0.6	▲0.4
dieBasis					754	0.6	▼2.3
PARTEI					671	0.5	▼0.3
ÖDP					629	0.5	▼0.3
BP					278	0.2	▼0.4
BD					145	0.1	
Humanists					95	0.1	Steady
MLPD					19	0.0	Steady
Informal votes		937			448		
Total valid votes		135,926			136,415		
Turnout		136,863	85.0	▲4.9			
CSU hold	Majority	35,328	26.0	▼0.5			

=== 2021 election ===
Federal election (2021): Ostallgäu
Notes:	Blue background denotes the winner of the electorate vote. Pink background denotes a candidate elected from their party list. Yellow background denotes an electorate win by a list member, or other incumbent. A ✓ or ✗ denotes status of any incumbent, win or lose respectively.						
Party	Candidate	Votes	%	±%	Party votes	%	±%
CSU	✓ Stephan Stracke	76,399	38.8	▼10.4	62,635	31.7	▼10.3
SPD	Regina Leenders	24,288	12.3	▲0.9	30,914	15.6	▲3.5
Greens	Daniel Pflügl	24,128	12.2	▲3.5	23,712	12.0	▲3.5
AfD	Christian Sedlmeir	20,021	10.2	▼2.5	19,779	10.0	▼3.3
FW	Mariana Braunmiller	17,819	9.0	▲5.6	17,985	9.1	▲6.4
FDP	Kai Fackler	14,258	7.2	▲1.6	21,561	10.9	▲0.4
dieBasis	Florian Mayr	7,303	3.7		5,832	3.0	
Left	Susanne Ferschl	6,667	3.4	▼2.0	5,007	2.5	▼2.9
Tierschutzpartei					2,086	1.1	▲0.2
ÖDP	Alexander Abt	3,120	1.6	▼0.4	1,948	1.0	▼0.5
PARTEI	Christian Armster	2,340	1.2		1,416	0.7	▲0.2
BP					1,033	0.5	▼0.6
Pirates					767	0.4	▲0.1
Team Todenhöfer					685	0.3	
Unabhängige					407	0.2	
Bündnis C					347	0.2	
Volt					334	0.2	
V-Partei3	Christiana Hofer	782	0.4		307	0.2	0.0
NPD					214	0.1	▼0.2
Gesundheitsforschung					208	0.1	0.0
Humanists					163	0.1	
du.					125	0.1	
The III. Path					100	0.1	
LKR					31	0.0	
DKP					25	0.0	0.0
MLPD					22	0.0	0.0
Informal votes		1,542			1,024		
Total valid votes		197,125			197,643		
Turnout		198,667	79.3	▲1.9			
CSU hold	Majority	52,111	26.5	▼10.0			

=== 2017 election ===
Federal election (2017): Ostallgäu
Notes:	Blue background denotes the winner of the electorate vote. Pink background denotes a candidate elected from their party list. Yellow background denotes an electorate win by a list member, or other incumbent. A ✓ or ✗ denotes status of any incumbent, win or lose respectively.						
Party	Candidate	Votes	%	±%	Party votes	%	±%
CSU	✓ Stephan Stracke	93,430	49.2	▼10.6	79,932	42.0	▼13.1
AfD	Christoph Maier	24,018	12.6	▲8.5	25,384	13.3	▲8.5
SPD	Pascal André Lechler	21,610	11.4	▼3.7	23,044	12.1	▼2.9
Greens	Günter Claus Räder	16,537	8.7	▲2.7	16,214	8.5	▲1.4
FDP	Jonas Flott	10,627	5.6	▲3.9	19,898	10.5	▲5.8
Left	Susanne Ferschl	10,153	5.3	▲2.5	10,387	5.5	▲2.3
FW	Susen Knabner	6,445	3.4	▲0.1	5,112	2.7	0.0
ÖDP	Krimhilde Dornach	3,813	2.0	0.0	2,789	1.5	▼0.1
BP	Jürgen Eißner	2,660	1.4	▼1.5	2,123	1.1	▼0.6
PARTEI					949	0.5	
Pirates					629	0.3	▼1.4
Independent	Werner Fischer	596	0.3				
NPD					532	0.3	▼0.5
DM					424	0.2	
BGE					345	0.2	
V-Partei³					325	0.2	
Gesundheitsforschung					227	0.1	
DiB					219	0.1	
MLPD					35	0.0	0.0
BüSo					24	0.0	0.0
DKP					24	0.0	
Informal votes		1,692			1,412		
Total valid votes		189,889			190,169		
Turnout		191,581	77.4	▲8.8			
CSU hold	Majority	69,412	36.6	▼8.2			

=== 2013 election ===
Federal election (2013): Ostallgäu
Notes:	Blue background denotes the winner of the electorate vote. Pink background denotes a candidate elected from their party list. Yellow background denotes an electorate win by a list member, or other incumbent. A ✓ or ✗ denotes status of any incumbent, win or lose respectively.						
Party	Candidate	Votes	%	±%	Party votes	%	±%
CSU	✓ Stephan Stracke	99,333	59.8	▲8.7	91,664	55.1	▲8.7
SPD	Rolf Spitz	25,009	15.0	▲1.4	24,971	15.0	▲2.8
Greens	Elfriede Klein	10,039	6.0	▼2.9	11,785	7.1	▼2.2
AfD	Franz Knapp	6,842	4.1		7,991	4.8	
FW	Hermann Zelt	5,425	3.3		4,537	2.7	
BP	Thomas Hilscher	4,808	2.9	▼0.3	2,913	1.8	▲0.1
Left	Paul Meichelböck	4,731	2.8	▼2.4	5,270	3.2	▼2.4
Pirates	Anton Betzler	3,260	2.0		2,904	1.7	0.0
ÖDP	Lucia Fischer	3,258	2.0	▼0.2	2,593	1.6	▼0.1
FDP	René Müller	2,847	1.7	▼10.9	7,677	4.6	▼12.3
NPD					1,374	0.8	▼0.5
Tierschutzpartei					1,103	0.7	▲0.1
Independent	Werner Fischer	660	0.4				
REP					587	0.4	▼0.2
DIE FRAUEN					382	0.2	
DIE VIOLETTEN					199	0.1	▼0.1
Party of Reason					176	0.1	
PRO					114	0.1	
RRP					42	0.0	▼0.5
MLPD					30	0.0	0.0
BüSo					28	0.0	0.0
Informal votes		1,456			1,328		
Total valid votes		166,212			166,340		
Turnout		167,668	68.6	▼1.7			
CSU hold	Majority	74,324	44.8	▲7.4			

=== 2009 election ===
Federal election (2009): Ostallgäu
Notes:	Blue background denotes the winner of the electorate vote. Pink background denotes a candidate elected from their party list. Yellow background denotes an electorate win by a list member, or other incumbent. A ✓ or ✗ denotes status of any incumbent, win or lose respectively.						
Party	Candidate	Votes	%	±%	Party votes	%	±%
CSU	Stephan Stracke	85,429	51.1	▼9.9	77,911	46.4	▼10.1
SPD	Rolf Spitz	22,859	13.7	▼5.3	20,544	12.2	▼6.6
FDP	Bernd Rösel	21,115	12.6	▲5.7	28,362	16.9	▲6.6
Greens	Tobias Specht	15,030	9.0	▲2.3	15,668	9.3	▲2.7
Left	Paul Meichelböck	8,822	5.3	▲2.5	9,369	5.6	▲2.8
Pirates					2,951	1.8	
BP	Peter Fendt	5,367	3.2		2,849	1.7	▲0.9
ÖDP	Daniel Ansorge	3,671	2.2		2,728	1.6	
NPD	Kurt-Jürgen Blank	2,814	1.7	▼0.3	2,262	1.3	▼0.1
FAMILIE					1,196	0.7	▼0.1
Independent	Werner Fischer	1,125	0.7				
Tierschutzpartei					1,018	0.6	
REP					1,010	0.6	▼0.3
RRP					803	0.5	
Freie Union	Frank Alfred Stengel	737	0.4				
CM					397	0.2	
PBC					390	0.2	▼0.1
DIE VIOLETTEN					334	0.2	
Independent	Margitta Gisela Stephan	263	0.2				
DVU					119	0.1	
BüSo					85	0.1	0.0
MLPD					34	0.0	0.0
Informal votes		2,992			2,194		
Total valid votes		167,232			168,030		
Turnout		170,224	70.2	▼7.5			
CSU hold	Majority	62,570	37.4	▼4.6			

=== 2005 election ===
Federal election (2005):Ostallgäu
Notes:	Blue background denotes the winner of the electorate vote. Pink background denotes a candidate elected from their party list. Yellow background denotes an electorate win by a list member, or other incumbent. A ✓ or ✗ denotes status of any incumbent, win or lose respectively.						
Party	Candidate	Votes	%	±%	Party votes	%	±%
CSU	✓ Kurt Rossmanith	110,880	60.9	▼3.9	103806	56.5	▼9.0
SPD	Lars Holstein	34,467	18.9	▼2.9	34,651	18.9	▼1.4
FDP	Roland Rehmet	12,640	6.9	▲2.2	18,841	10.3	▲5.5
Greens	Tobias Specht	12,241	6.7	▲0.9	12,225	6.7	▲0.6
Left	Michael Goldberg	5,055	2.8	▲2.0	5,185	2.8	▲2.2
NPD	Kurt-Jürgen Blank	3,655	2.0		2,612	1.4	▲1.2
Independent	Werner Fischer	2,531	1.4				
REP					1,580	0.9	▲0.3
BP					1,544	0.8	▲0.6
Familie					1,415	0.8	
PBC					674	0.4	▲0.2
GRAUEN					560	0.3	▲0.2
Independent	Jürgen Kreuter	498	0.3				
Feminist					464	0.3	▲0.1
BüSo					145	0.1	0.0
MLPD					81	0.0	
Informal votes		4,414			2,598		
Total valid votes		181,968			183,783		
Turnout		186,381	77.8	▼3.1			
CSU hold	Majority	76,416	42				
