= International Conference on Concurrency Theory =

- Abbreviation: CONCUR
- Discipline: concurrency

Publication details
- Publisher: LIPICS, Lecture Notes in Computer Science
- History: 1984-present
- Frequency: Annually

The International Conference on Concurrency Theory (CONCUR) is an academic conference in the field of computer science, with focus on the theory of concurrency and its applications. It is the flagship conference for concurrency theory according to the International Federation for Information Processing Working Group on Concurrency Theory (WP 1.8). The conference is organised annually since 1988. Since 2015, papers presented at CONCUR are published in the LIPIcs–Leibniz International Proceedings in Informatics, a "series of high-quality conference proceedings across all fields in informatics established in cooperation with Schloss Dagstuhl –Leibniz Center for Informatics". Before, CONCUR papers were published in the series Lecture Notes in Computer Science.

- According to CORE Ranking, CONCUR has rank A ("excellent conference, and highly respected in a discipline area").
- According to Google Scholar Metrics (as of 1. April 2023), CONCUR has H5-index 17 and H5-median 22.

== Editions ==
- 37th CONCUR 2026: Liverpool, UK
- 36th CONCUR 2025: Aarhus, Denmark
- 35th CONCUR 2024: Calgary, Canada
- 34th CONCUR 2023: Antwerp, Belgium
- 33rd CONCUR 2022: Warsaw, Poland
- 32nd CONCUR 2021: ~~Paris, France~~ Online
- 31st CONCUR 2020: ~~Vienna, Austria~~ Online
- 30th CONCUR 2019: Amsterdam, the Netherlands
- 29th CONCUR 2018: Beijing, China
- 28th CONCUR 2017: Berlin, Germany
- 27th CONCUR 2016: Québec City, Canada
- 26th CONCUR 2015: Madrid, Spain
- 25th CONCUR 2014: Rome, Italy
- 24th CONCUR 2013: Buenos Aires, Argentina
- 23rd CONCUR 2012: Newcastle upon Tyne, UK
- 22nd CONCUR 2011: Aachen, Germany
- 21st CONCUR 2010: Paris, France
- 20th CONCUR 2009: Bologna, Italy
- 19th CONCUR 2008: Toronto, Canada
- 18th CONCUR 2007: Lisbon, Portugal
- 17th CONCUR 2006: Bonn, Germany
- 16th CONCUR 2005: San Francisco, CA, USA
- 15th CONCUR 2004: London, UK
- 14th CONCUR 2003: Marseille, France
- 13th CONCUR 2002: Brno, Czech Republic
- 12th CONCUR 2001: Aalborg, Denmark
- 11th CONCUR 2000: Pennsylvania State University, Pennsylvania, USA
- 10th CONCUR 1999: Eindhoven, The Netherlands
- 9th CONCUR 1998: Nice, France
- 8th CONCUR 1997: Warsaw, Poland
- 7th CONCUR 1996: Pisa, Italy
- 6th CONCUR 1995: Philadelphia, PA, USA
- 5th CONCUR 1994: Uppsala, Sweden
- 4th CONCUR 1993: Hildesheim, Germany
- 3rd CONCUR 1992: Stony Brook, NY, USA
- 2nd CONCUR 1991: Amsterdam, the Netherlands
- 1st CONCUR 1990: Amsterdam, the Netherlands
- Concurrency: Theory, Language, And Architecture 1989: Oxford, UK
- Concurrency 1988: Hamburg, Germany
- Seminar on Concurrency 1984: Pittsburgh, PA, USA

== Test-of-Time Award ==
In 2020, the International Conference on Concurrency Theory (CONCUR) and the IFIP Working Group 1.8 on Concurrency Theory established the CONCUR Test-of-Time Award. The goal of the Award is to recognize important achievements in concurrency theory that have stood the test of time, and were published at CONCUR since its first edition in 1990.

Starting with CONCUR 2024, an award event will take place every other year, and recognize one or two papers presented at CONCUR in the 4-year period from 20 to 17 years earlier. From 2020 to 2023 two such award events are combined each year, in order to also recognize achievements that appeared in the early editions of CONCUR.

=== 2026 ===
==== Period 2006–2009 ====
- Naoki Kobayashi: "A New Type System for Deadlock-Free Processes." (CONCUR 2006)
- Krishnendu Chatterjee, Thomas A. Henzinger & Nir Piterman: "Strategy Logic." (CONCUR 2007)

=== 2024 ===
==== Period 2004–2007 ====
- Stephen D. Brookes: "A Semantics for Concurrent Separation Logic." (CONCUR 2004)
- Peter W. O'Hearn: "Resources, Concurrency and Local Reasoning." (CONCUR 2004)

=== 2023 ===
==== Period 2002–2005 ====
- Vincent Danos, Jean Krivine: "Reversible Communicating Systems." (CONCUR 2004)

=== 2022 ===
==== Period 2000–2003 ====
- Luca de Alfaro, Marco Faella, Thomas A. Henzinger, Rupak Majumdar & Mariëlle Stoelinga: "The Element of Surprise in Timed Games." (CONCUR 2003)
- James J. Leifer & Robin Milner: "Deriving Bisimulation Congruences for Reactive Systems." (CONCUR 2000)

==== Period 1998–2001 ====
- Franck Cassez & Kim Larsen: "The Impressive Power of Stopwatches" (CONCUR 2000)
- Christel Baier, Joost-Pieter Katoen & Holger Hermanns: "Approximate symbolic model checking of continuous-time Markov chains." (CONCUR 1999)

=== 2021 ===
==== Period 1996–1999 ====
- Rajeev Alur, Thomas A. Henzinger, Orna Kupferman & Moshe Y. Vardi: "Alternating Refinement Relations" (CONCUR 1998)
- Ahmed Bouajjani, Javier Esparza & Oded Maler: "Reachability Analysis of Pushdown Automata: Application to Model-checking" (CONCUR 1997)

==== Period 1994–1997 ====
- Uwe Nestmann & Benjamin C. Pierce: "Decoding Choice Encodings" (CONCUR 1996)
- David Janin & Igor Walukiewicz: "On the Expressive Completeness of the Propositional mu-Calculus with Respect to Monadic Second Order Logic." (CONCUR 1996)

=== 2020 ===
==== Period 1992–1995 ====
- Roberto Segala & Nancy Lynch: "Probabilistic Simulations for Probabilistic Processes" (CONCUR 1994)
- Davide Sangiorgi: "A Theory of Bisimulation for the pi-Calculus" (CONCUR 1993)

==== Period 1990–1993 ====
- Rob van Glabbeek: "The Linear Time-Branching Time Spectrum" (CONCUR 1993)
- Søren Christensen, Hans Hüttel & Colin Stirling: "Bisimulation Equivalence is Decidable for all Context-Free Processes" (CONCUR 1992)

== Affiliated events ==
- International Conference on Formal Modeling and Analysis of Timed Systems (FORMATS)
- International Conference on Quantitative Evaluation of SysTems (QEST)

== See also ==
- List of computer science conferences
- List of computer science conference acronyms
- Outline of computer science
