= Javier Esparza =

Javier Esparza may refer to:

- Javier Esparza (computer scientist)
- Javier Esparza (politician)
