= Lenore Zuck =

Israeli-American computer scientist

Lenore D. Zuck
- לינור ד. צוק
- Born: 1958 (age 67–68); Tel Aviv, Israel
- Education: Technion – Israel Institute of Technology, Weizmann Institute of Science
- Known for: Formal methods in software engineering, Information privacy
- Scientific career
- Fields: Computer science
- Workplaces: University of Illinois Chicago
- Doctoral advisor: Amir Pnueli

Lenore D. Zuck (Hebrew: לינור ד. צוק; born 1958) is an Israeli-American computer scientist whose research involves formal methods in software engineering, as well as information privacy. She is a research professor of computer science at the University of Illinois Chicago.

== Education and career ==
Zuck was born in Tel Aviv in 1958, and earned a bachelor's degree in 1979 from the Technion – Israel Institute of Technology. She went to the Weizmann Institute of Science for graduate study in computer science, earning a master's degree in 1983 and a Ph.D. in 1987. Her doctoral dissertation, Past Temporal Logic, concerned temporal logic, and was supervised by Amir Pnueli.

She was an associate professor of computer science at Yale University, and then at New York University, before moving to the University of Illinois Chicago in the early 2000s.

== Awards and honors ==
- 2014: ACM Distinguished Member

== Selected publications ==
- Lichtenstein, Orna; Pnueli, Amir; Zuck, Lenore D. (1985), "The glory of the past", in Parikh, Rohit (ed.), Logics of Programs, Conference, Brooklyn College, New York, NY, USA, June 17-19, 1985, Proceedings, Lecture Notes in Computer Science, vol. 193, Springer, pp. 196–218, doi:10.1007/3-540-15648-8_16, ISBN 978-3-540-15648-2
- Halpern, Joseph Y.; Zuck, Lenore D. (1992), "A little knowledge goes a long way: knowledge-based derivations and correctness proofs for a family of protocols", Journal of the ACM, 39 (3): 449–478, doi:10.1145/146637.146638, S2CID 52149700
- Pnueli, Amir; Zuck, Lenore D. (1993), "Probabilistic verification", Information and Computation, 103 (1): 1–29, doi:10.1006/inco.1993.1012, MR 1213090
- Afek, Yehuda; Attiya, Hagit; Fekete, Alan D.; Fischer, Michael J.; Lynch, Nancy A.; Mansour, Yishay; Wang, Da-Wei; Zuck, Lenore D. (1994), "Reliable communication over unreliable channels", Journal of the ACM, 41 (6): 1267–1297, doi:10.1145/195613.195651, hdl:1721.1/149174, S2CID 8784721
- Carriero, Nicholas; Gelernter, David; Zuck, Lenore D. (1994), "Bauhaus Linda", in Ciancarini, Paolo; Nierstrasz, Oscar; Yonezawa, Akinori (eds.), Object-Based Models and Languages for Concurrent Systems, ECOOP'94 Workshop on Models and Languages for Coordination of Parallelism and Distribution, Bologna, Italy, July 5, 1994, Selected Papers, Lecture Notes in Computer Science, vol. 924, Springer, pp. 66–76, doi:10.1007/3-540-59450-7_5, ISBN 978-3-540-59450-5
- Pnueli, Amir; Ruah, Sitvanit; Zuck, Lenore D. (2001), "Automatic deductive verification with invisible invariants", in Margaria, Tiziana; Yi, Wang (eds.), Tools and Algorithms for the Construction and Analysis of Systems, 7th International Conference, TACAS 2001 Held as Part of the Joint European Conferences on Theory and Practice of Software, ETAPS 2001 Genova, Italy, April 2–6, 2001, Proceedings, Lecture Notes in Computer Science, vol. 2031, Springer, pp. 82–97, doi:10.1007/3-540-45319-9_7, ISBN 978-3-540-41865-8
- Pnueli, Amir; Xu, Jessie; Zuck, Lenore D. (2002), "Liveness with (0, 1, ∞)-counter abstraction", in Brinksma, Ed; Larsen, Kim Guldstrand (eds.), Computer Aided Verification, 14th International Conference, CAV 2002, Copenhagen, Denmark, July 27–31, 2002, Proceedings, Lecture Notes in Computer Science, vol. 2404, Springer, pp. 107–122, doi:10.1007/3-540-45657-0_9, ISBN 978-3-540-43997-4
