= Rösle =

German company

Rösle Metallwarenfabrik GmbH & Co KG
- Company type: GmbH
- Founded: 1888; 138 years ago
- Headquarters: Marktoberdorf, Bavaria, Germany
- Area served: parts of Europe, North America, West Asia, China, Japan, Philippines, New Zealand
- Products: Kitchenware
- Revenue: €25 million (annual)
- Number of employees: 150
- Website: www.roesle.de

Rösle Open Kitchen

Rösle is a kitchen accessory manufacturer based in the small Bavarian town of Marktoberdorf in Germany. Rösle developed the Open Kitchen concept. Originally started in 1888 by Karl Theodor Rösle as an industrial roofing manufacturer, Rösle expanded into kitchen utensils prior to World War II. The company saw rapid growth throughout the 1950s and onwards and in 1993 the Rösle brand became solely dedicated to kitchen tools. In 2012, RÖSLE started their own BBQ range.

== Production changes ==
In 2009 the company closed its factory in Germany and sub-contracted production to various firms in China. While insisting the quality would remain, consumer feedback has been poor, leading to a growing market for used, German-made Rösle products.

As of 2022, the Masterclass sub-brand of knives are made in Solingen, Germany.
