= Los Cantantes de Manila =

Choir from Manila, Philippines

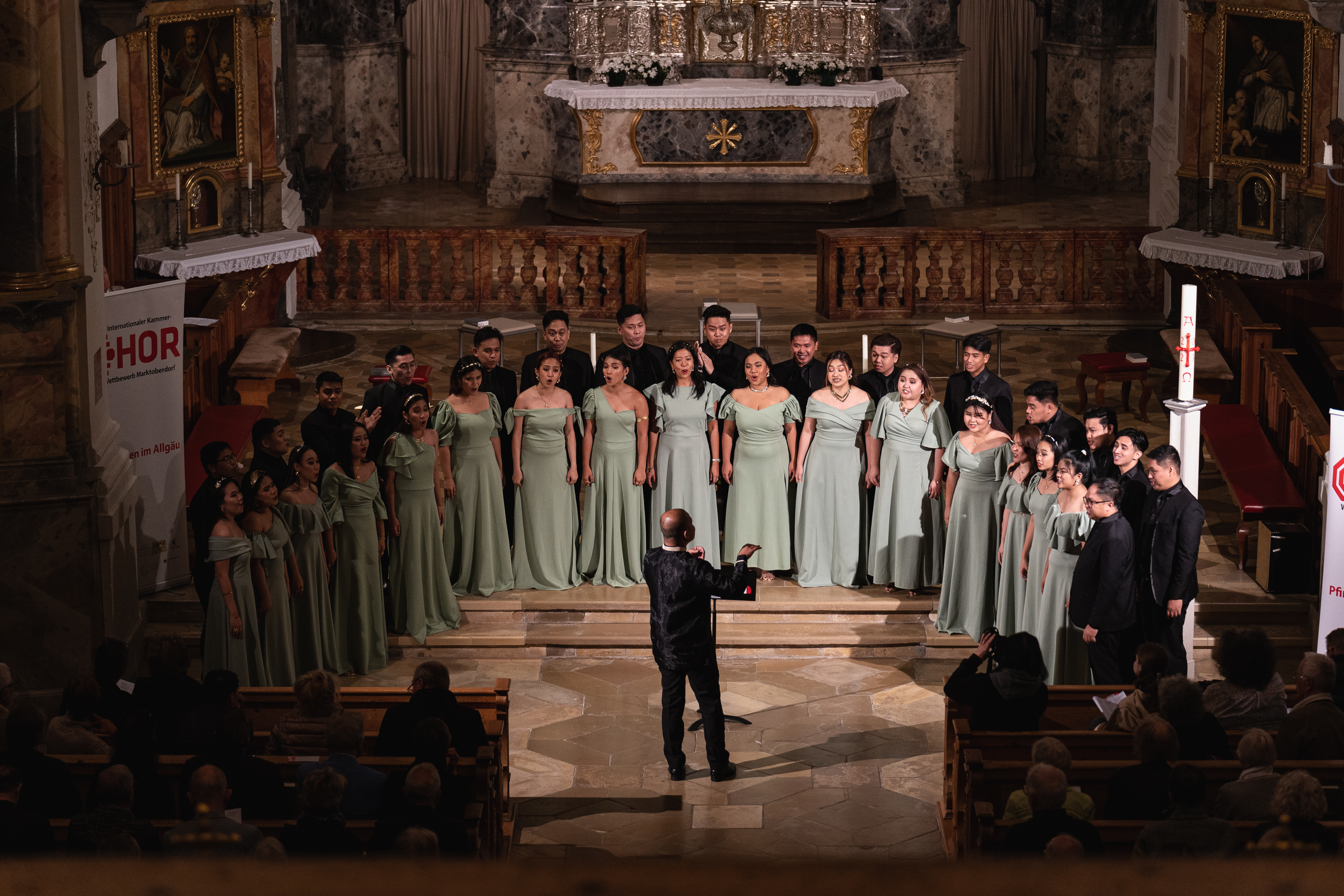
- Los Cantantes de Manila in concert at St. Martin Church in Marktoberdorf, Germany

Background information
- Origin: Manila, Philippines
- Years active: 2014––present

Los Cantantes de Manila (LCDM) is a community choir based in Manila, Philippines. The choir is composed of students, young professionals, and musicians. Their repertoire includes classical composers such as Bruckner and Monteverdi, as well as contemporary artists like Beyoncé and John Lennon.

Founded in February 2014 and directed by Darwin Vargas, LCDM has performed in various countries including Hungary, Italy, Russia, Spain, the Netherlands, South Korea, Singapore, Germany, and the Philippines.

The choir has received recognition for its performances, including two Ani ng Dangal awards from the National Commission for Culture and the Arts (NCCA) in 2016. and in 2019

== Awards ==
=== International competitions ===
Year	Location	Competition	Awards
2024	Moscow, Russia	2024 Moscow A Cappella Festival	1st Prize – Large Vocal Group Category
2024	Arezzo, Italy	72nd Concorso polifonico Guido d'Arezzo	Citta Di Arezzo Grand Prize; Right to represent and compete at the 2025 European Grand Prix for Choral Singing in Tolosa, Spain; 1st Prize – Compulsory Programme; 1st Prize – Sacred Music Programme; 1st Prize – Secular Music Programme
2024	Debrecen, Hungary	29th Béla Bartók International Choir Competition	Grand Prix Finalist; 1st Prize – Free Category; 1st Prize – Sacred Category; Special Prize of Editio Musica Budapest for the Best Interpretation of the Compulsory Piece (Cantate Domino)
2024	Torrevieja, Spain	70th Certamen Coral Internacional de Habaneras y Polifonia	4th Prize – Polyphony Category
2023	Manila, Philippines	5th Andrea O. Veneracion International Choral Festival	1st Prize – Folk Song Category
2023	Marktoberdorf, Germany	18th International Chamber Choir Competition Marktoberdorf	1st Prize – Mixed Choirs Category; Achievement Level I – Excellent Performance at an International Level; Noël Minet Prize for the Best Interpretation of a Romantic Choral Work (Christus Factus Est); Walter & Charlotte Hamel Foundation Special Prize for a Particularly Ourstanding Characteristic Vocal Presentation (Day Baling Mingawa); Marktoberdorf Public Award
2019	Marktoberdorf, Germany	16th International Chamber Choir Competition Marktoberdorf	4th Place – Mixed Choirs Category; Achievement Level I – Excellent Performance at an International Level
2019	Kerkrade, Netherlands	5th CantaRode International Choir Competition 2019	3rd Prize; Audience Prize
2019	Varna, Bulgaria	2019 International May Choir Competition “Prof. Georgi Dimitrov”	Participant (Unable to compete)
2018	Singapore, Singapore	5th Singapore International Choral Festival	Gold Prize – Mixed Voices Open Category; Gold Prize – Sacred Category
2017	Marktoberdorf, Germany	15th International Chamber Choir Competition Marktoberdorf	1st Prize – Popular Choir Music Category; Achievement Level I – Excellent Performance at an International Level; Special Prize for a Particularly Outstanding Characteristic Vocal Presentation (If I Had My Way); Marktoberdorf Public Award
2015	Busan, South Korea	11th Busan International Choir Festival and Competition	Grand Prix Winner; Gold Prize – Classical Mixed Category; Silver Prize – Pop/A Capella Category
