= Tiziana Margaria =

Italian software engineer

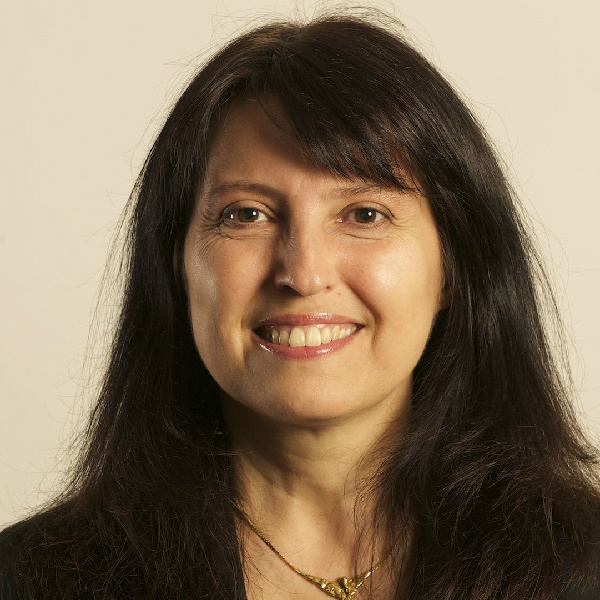
- Margaria in 2014
- Born: 14 October 1964 (age 61); Turin, Italy
- Scientific career
- Fields: Formal methods, Model-driven engineering
- Institutions: University of Limerick, Lero

Tiziana Margaria (born 14 October 1964) is an Italian computer scientist and software engineer whose research topics include formal methods and model-driven engineering. Educated in Italy, she has worked in Italy, Germany, Sweden, and Ireland, and currently works in Ireland as Chair of Software Systems in the University of Limerick's Department of Computer Science and Information Systems.

== Biography ==
Tiziana was born in 1964. After high school at the Liceo Scientifico Gino Segrè in Turin, Margaria studied for a laurea in electronic engineering at the Polytechnic University of Turin, which she completed in 1988. She completed her Ph.D. there in 1993, with the dissertation Verifica formale della correttezza del progetto di sistemi digitali.

Meanwhile she held a teaching position at the University of Udine from 1988 to 1991, and was a visiting researcher at RWTH Aachen University from 1991 to 1993. From 1993 to 1998 she was a postdoctoral researcher at the University of Passau, working there with Christian Lengauer. She continued to work as a researcher at the Technical University of Dortmund from 1998 to 2004, also working as a visiting professor in Sweden at Uppsala University from 1999 to 2000.

In 2004 she obtained a permanent faculty position, as professor of service engineering for distributed systems at the University of Göttingen. She moved to the University of Potsdam in 2006, as Chair of Service and Software Engineering. In 2015 she moved again, to the University of Limerick and Lero, the Science Foundation Ireland Research Centre for Software in Limerick, where she is Chair of Software Systems.

In July 2023 she was elected as incoming new president of the University of Lübeck, Lübeck, Germany. In February 2024 she was voted out by the senate of the University of Lübeck.

== Work ==
Margaria's initial research interests included formal verification of hardware. In the early 1990s she switched focus to using similar mathematical methods for the formal verification of software, making major contributions in particular to Agent verification. She also played a role in the evolution of service orientated architecture and in low-code development platforms. A people person as well as a scientist, she has for decades been active in the organisation of computing related learned societies and conferences, in addition to co-founding and editing several journals. Margaria has also been an active educator, including as part of efforts to encourage more girls and women in STEM.

Margaria is a Fellow and the current President of the Irish Computer Society and a Fellow of the Society for Design and Process Science. She is member of the Board of the ERCIM Working Group on Formal Methods for Industrial Critical Systems (FMICS), serves as a member of the steering committee of the European Joint Conferences on Theory and Practice of Software (ETAPS), and is a vice-chair of the Design and Engineering of Electronic Systems working group of the International Federation for Information Processing (IFIP).

She became founding co-editor-in-chief of the International Journal on Software Tools for Technology Transfer in 1997. In the same year, she also founded and served as CEO for the Dortmund based company METAFrame Technologies , which specialised in software for technology transfer, and for formal verification.

Until 2016 she was Managing Editor of the Electronic Communications of the European Association of Software Science and Technology (ECEASST) journal. She became a fellow of the Society for Design and Process Science (SDPS). She is Co-director of the Science Foundation Ireland and of the Centre of Research Training in AI based in Ireland.

Most recently she leads the R@ISE project, a Science Foundation Ireland strategic partnership program on Low-code/No-code software development for high assurance software in cooperation with co-funding industrial partners and the Limerick city and county council.

== Personal life ==
Margaria married computer scientist Bernhard Steffen in 1992; they have two children.
