= ESOP =

ESOP may refer to:

- European Symposium on Programming, a conference in computer science
- Employee stock ownership plan, an employee-owner scheme

== See also ==
- Aesop, often written Esop before 1800, the ancient Greek fabulist and storyteller
