= Andreas Settele =

German politician

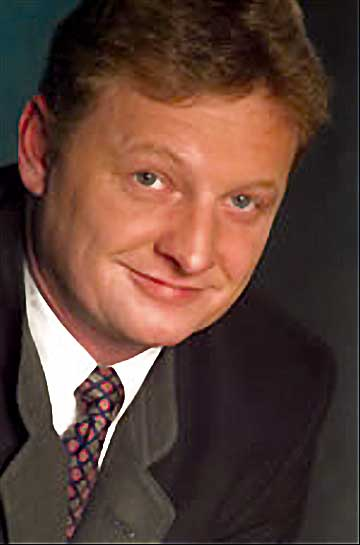
Andreas Settele

Andreas Settele (born 1961 in Marktoberdorf) is a German politician. From 2002 to 2007 he was the chairman of the Bavarian separatist party, Bavaria Party. He first served in this position provisionally, after Jürgen Kalb resigned. He was subsequently elected on 15 September 2002.
