= ESWC =

ESWC may refer to:

== Academia ==
- Extended Semantic Web Conference

== Esports ==
- Esports World Cup
- Esports World Convention
