= ETAPS International Joint Conferences on Theory and Practice of Software =

- Abbreviation: ETAPS
- Discipline: Computer Science

Publication details
- Publisher: Springer
- History: since 1998
- Frequency: yearly
- Open access: Gold Open Access
- Website: https://etaps.org

The ETAPS International Joint Conferences on Theory and Practice of Software (ETAPS) is a confederation of (currently) four computer science conferences taking place annually at one conference site, usually at the end of March or in April. Three of the four conferences (FoSSaCS, FASE, TACAS) are top ranked in software engineering and one (ESOP) is top ranked in programming languages.

Originally, ETAPS stood for European Joint Conferences on Theory and Practice of Software, however, in April 2024 at the steering committee meeting during the conference in Luxembourg, it was decided to replace the word "European" by "International" to avoid casting the conference as regional (European). To preserve the acronym, the current full name also contains "ETAPS", making it recursive.

ETAPS conferences are organized by local organizers at the organizing institution (typically a university), and coordinated by ETAPS Steering Committee, which is formed by the Executive Board and standard SC members.

ETAPS Association (ETAPS e.V. in German) is a supporting body of the ETAPS conferences. It is formed by scientists and practitioners with relation to the ETAPS conferences' topics; the membership is free. The chair of the ETAPS steering committee is also the president of the ETAPS association. The members have access to the association website.

== Constituting conferences ==
ETAPS currently confederates the following conferences:

- European Symposium on Programming (ESOP, since 1998), ranked A in CORE2023
- Fundamental Approaches to Software Engineering (FASE, since 1998), ranked B in CORE2023
- Foundations of Software Science and Computation Structures (FoSSaCS, since 1998), ranked A in CORE2023
- Tools and Algorithms for the Construction and Analysis of Systems (TACAS, since 1998), ranked A in CORE2023

From 1995 to 2015, the International Conference on Compiler Construction (CC) and from 2012 to 2019 Principles of Security and Trust (POST) were constituting conferences as well.

=== TACAS ===
TACAS (Tools and Algorithms for the Construction and Analysis of Systems) is a conference that focuses on the application of and tool support for various formal methods. It is one of the top-ranked conferences for software engineering. It was founded by Bernhard Steffen, Rance Cleaveland, Ed Brinksma, and Kim Larsen. The first TACAS was held in 1995 in Aarhus, Denmark followed by the conferences in 1996 in Passau, Germany and 1997 in Enschede, Netherlands. TACAS was one of the first five constituting conferences of ETAPS in 1998.

=== ESOP ===
ESOP (European Symposium on Programming) is a conference that focuses on fundamental issues in the specification, design, analysis, and implementation of programming languages and systems. It is one of the top-ranked conferences for programming languages. The first edition of ESOP was held in March 1986 in Saarbrücken.

=== FASE ===
FASE (Fundamental Approaches to Software Engineering) is a conference that focuses on the foundations which software engineering is built on. It replaced the conference Formal Aspects/Approaches to Software Engineering while keeping its acronym.

=== FoSSaCS ===
FoSSaCS (International Conference on Foundations of Software Science and Computation Structures) is a conference that focuses on foundational research in software science, especially theories and methods for the analysis, integration, synthesis, transformation, and verification of programs and software systems. Its first edition was held as part of first ETAPS in 1998. It can be seen as a successor of the conference CAAP, Colloque sur les Arbres en Algèbre et en Programmation.

== Awards ==
Moreover, several best paper awards are granted by the constituent conferences:

- Test of Time Award
- Doctoral Dissertation Award
- ETAPS Lifetime Award
- Rance Cleaveland Test-of-Time Tool Award
