= Susanne Ferschl =

German politician (born 1973)

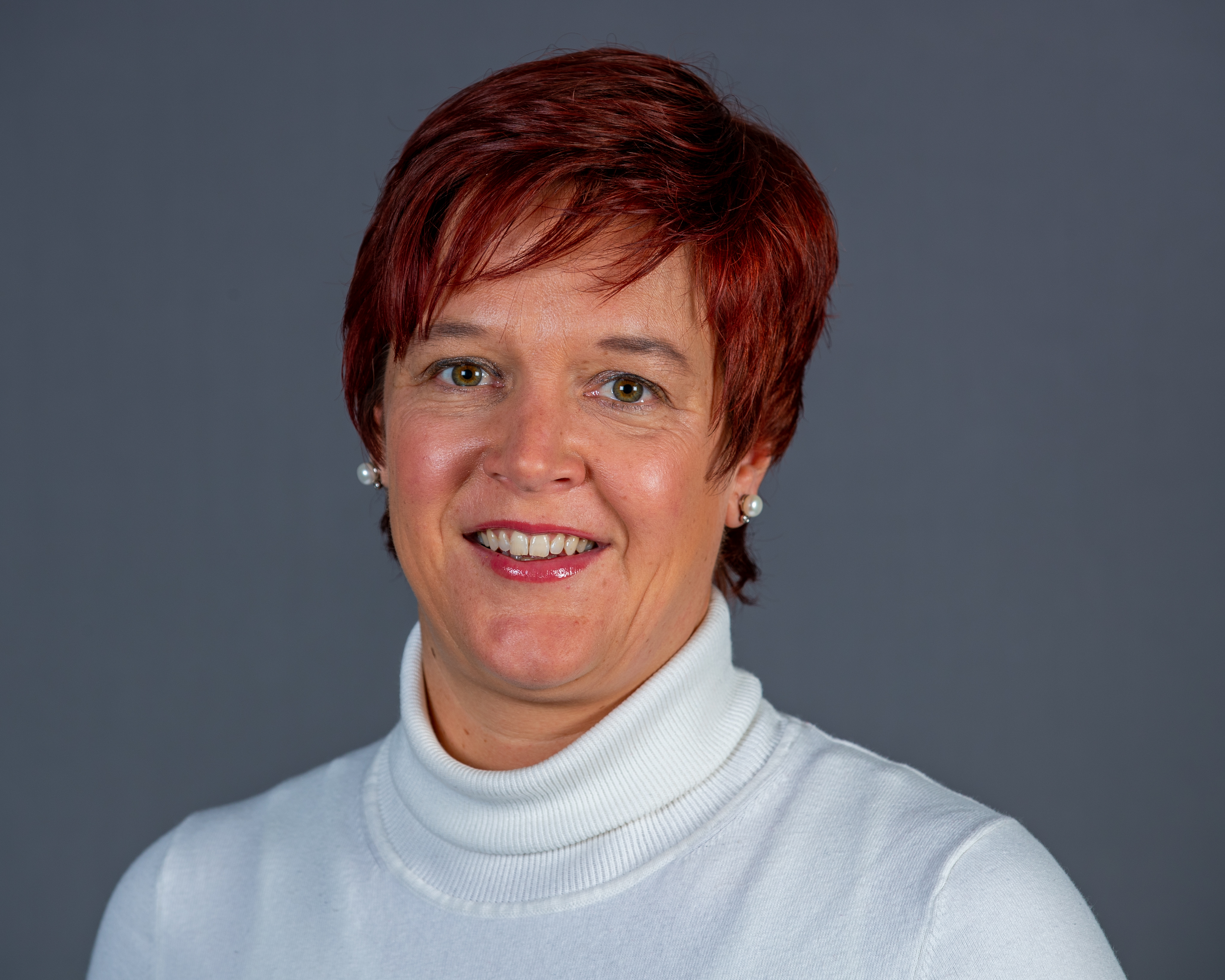
- Ferschl in 2020

Member of the Bundestag
- Incumbent
- Assumed office 2017

Personal details
- Born: 10 March 1973 (age 52); Schwaz, Germanyy
- Political party: The Left

Susanne Ferschl (born 10 March 1973) is a German politician. Born in Schwaz, she represents The Left. Susanne Ferschl has served as a member of the Bundestag from the state of Bavaria since 2017.

== Biography ==
Ferschl was born on 10 March 1973, and grew up in Allgäu. She finished school in 1992 with the Abitur. This was followed by training as a chemical laboratory assistant at the Nestlé factory in Biessenhofen. Later she also completed degrees as a business coach (of the Chamber of Industry and Commerce) and as a business mediator. In 2006, she was elected Chair of the Central Works Council of Nestlé Deutschland AG, as well as a member of the European Works Council and the Supervisory Board. She became a member of the Bundestag after the 2017 German federal election. She is a member of the Committee for Labour and Social Affairs. She is the vice-chair of her group. In July 2024, she announced that she isn't seeking re-election for Bundestag.
