= SSP Deutschland =

German travel catering company

SSP Deutschland is a main travel catering concessions company in Germany, the German division of the British SSP Group (Select Service Partner). It is the leader (führende Dienstleister) in the German travel catering market (Erfahrung im Bereich Reisen und Gastronomie).

== History ==
It was founded in 2006. It largely was a derivation of the former Mitropa travel catering company. It brands its company throughout Germany as the Food Travel Experts. It is part of SSP International, which operates around the world in 125 airports and 271 railway stations.

In July 2008 it bought the airport restaurant business of Lufthansa, LSG-Airport Gastronomiegesellschaft mbH or LAG, formerly part of LSG Sky Chefs. LAG operated 34 restaurants at six German airports (Berlin Tegel, Berlin Schönefeld, Bremen, Cologne, Frankfurt and Munich). LSG Sky Chefs is the world's largest provider of airline catering.

== Products ==
It has many outlets, run as concessions or franchises, at most German airports (Flughäfen), motorway service stations (Raststätten), and railway stations (Bahnhöfen).

== Structure ==
It is situated north-west of the junction of Bundesautobahn 66 and Bundesautobahn 5 in Eschborn. It has around 3,000 employees. Inside SSP, which has five international divisions, it is in the DACH division (Germany, Austria and Switzerland) of German-speaking countries.

== See also ==
- Category:Airport infrastructure
- Category:Transport infrastructure in Germany
- Nestlé Deutschland
