= Rance Cleaveland =

American computer scientist (1961–2024)

- Born: Walter Rance Cleaveland II; July 18, 1961; Baltimore, Maryland, USA
- Died: March 27, 2024 (aged 62); Arlington, Virginia, USA
- Education: Duke University; Cornell University
- Scientific career
- Workplaces: North Carolina State University; Stony Brook University; University of Maryland, College Park
- Thesis: Type-Theoretic Models of Concurrency (1987)
- Doctoral advisor: Robert Constable

Walter Rance Cleaveland II (July 18, 1961 – March 27, 2024) was an American computer scientist specializing in software verification, software systems, and related fields. In 2022, he became an Fellow of the IEEE for his contributions to verification tools for finite-state and cyber-physical systems.

== Education and career ==
Cleaveland started his studies at Duke University's Trinity College of Arts and Sciences in Fall 1978, graduating summa cum laude with a BS in Mathematics and Computer Science in 1982. Cleaveland then moved north for graduate studies at Cornell University, where he graduated with an MS in Computer Science in 1985 and a PhD in 1987, both in computer science. His PhD thesis was titled "Type-Theoretic Models of Concurrency" and was supervised by Robert Constable and mentored by Prakash Panangaden. Cleaveland conducted postdoctoral research from 1987 to 1989 at the University of Sussex in Brighton, England.

In 1989, Cleaveland became an assistant professor in computer science at North Carolina State University, where he became an associated professor in 1994 and a professor in 1998. There, he received the Shell Undergraduate Teaching Award in 1991, and the Alcoa Engineering Research prize. Cleaveland became a professor of computer science at Stony Brook University from 1998 to May 2005. Beginning in June 2005, he moved to the University of Maryland, College Park and became a professor of Computer Science. He received the Computer Science Excellence in Teaching Award in 2011. From June 2005 to December 2014, he was executive and scientific director of the Fraunhofer USA Center for Experimental Software Engineering. Beginning November, 2022, he was the Associate Dean of Research in the College of Computer, Mathematical, and Natural Sciences. He held joint appointments in the University of Maryland Institute for Advanced Computer Studies (UMIACS) beginning in June 2005, and the Institute for Systems Research beginning in July 2006.

From 2018 to 2022, Cleaveland was director of the Computing and Communication Foundations division of the Computer and Information Science and Engineering directorate of the National Science Foundation (NSF). Since 1995, he was a co-founder and a member of the steering committee of the International Conference on Tools and Algorithms for the Construction and Analysis of Systems (TACAS). From 1997 to 2001, he was a co-founder and co-editor-in-chief of the Springer journal Software Tools for Technology Transfer.

== Honors and awards ==
In 1992, Cleaveland received from the Young Investigator Award from the Office of Naval Research and NSF National Young Investigator Award. In 1994, he received the Alcoa Foundation Engineering Research Achievement Award. In 1998, he was elected as a member of International Federation for Information Processing Working Group 2.2. In 2008, he received the Excellence in Oral Presentation Award from the Society for Automotive Engineers. In 2022, he became an Fellow of the Northern Virginia section of the IEEE for "contributions to verification tools for finite-state and cyber-physical systems", after becoming a Senior Member in 2021; and was a member of the IEEE Computer Society.

== Personal life ==
Cleaveland was born to Ruzha and Clif Cleaveland in Baltimore, Maryland. He spent short periods of time at various elementary schools before moving to the McCallie School for Boys, a religious prep school in Chattanooga, Tennessee, which he graduated from in 1978. In 1993, he received an Alumni Achievement Award from McCallie, being eligible after his 15th reunion. McCallie school established a need-based scholarship in his name. Cleaveland married Karen Ann Hardee in 1988. They had children named Matthew Rance, Christian Gilbert, and Rachel Grace.
