= Stephan Stracke =

German politician

Stephan Stracke MdB
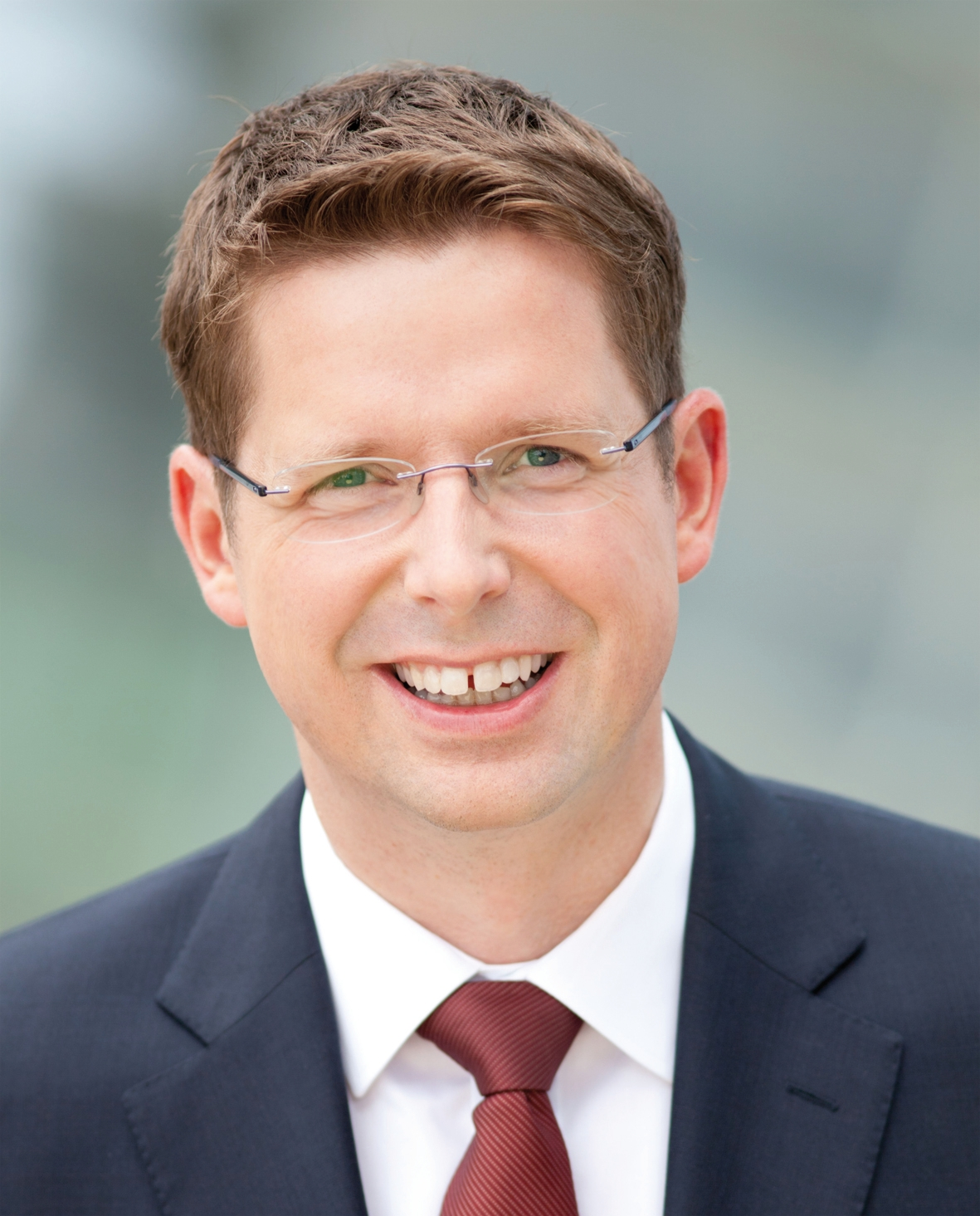
- Stracke in 2013

Member of the Bundestag; for Oberallgäu
- Incumbent
- Assumed office 27 October 2009
- Preceded by: Kurt Rossmanith

Personal details
- Born: 1 April 1974 (age 52) Marktoberdorf, West Germany
- Party: Christian Social Union
- Children: 3
- Education: University of Augsburg

Stephan Stracke (born 1 April 1974) is a German lawyer and politician of the Christian Social Union (CSU) who has been serving as a member of the Bundestag from the state of Bavaria since 2009.

== Political career ==
Stracke first became a member of the Bundestag in the 2009 German federal election, elected with a mandate in Oberallgäu. He is a member of the Committee for Labour and Social Affairs.

In the negotiations to form a coalition government following the 2013 federal elections, Stracke was part of the CDU/CSU delegation in the working group on health policy, led by Jens Spahn and Karl Lauterbach.

In April 2021, Stracke succeeded Georg Nüßlein as deputy chair of the CDU/CSU parliamentary group, under the leadership of chairman Ralph Brinkhaus.

== Other activities ==
- Deutsche Renten Information (DRI), Member of the Advisory Board

== Political positions ==
In June 2017, Stracke voted against Germany's introduction of same-sex marriage.
