= Dana Fisman =

Israeli computer scientist

- דנה פיסמן
- Education: Technion – Israel Institute of Technology, Weizmann Institute of Science
- Known for: Reconstruction of automaton-based models, temporal logic, Property Specification Language, program synthesis
- Scientific career
- Fields: Computer Science
- Workplaces: Ben-Gurion University of the Negev
- Thesis: (2006)
- Doctoral advisor: Amir Pnueli

Dana Fisman (Hebrew: דנה פיסמן) is an Israeli computer scientist whose research has included work on the reconstruction of automaton-based models in computational learning theory including induction of regular languages, on temporal logic and the Property Specification Language, and on program synthesis. She is an associate professor of computer science at Ben-Gurion University of the Negev.

== Education and career ==
Fisman earned a bachelor's degree from the Technion – Israel Institute of Technology in 1997. She went to the Weizmann Institute of Science for graduate study in computer science, earning both a master's degree and a Ph.D. there. She completed her doctorate in 2006, under the supervision of Amir Pnueli.

After her doctoral work, she became a postdoctoral researcher at the Hebrew University of Jerusalem. Meanwhile, she had been working in industry at the IBM Haifa Research Lab from 1997 to 2009; there she became one of the developers of the Property Specification Language for temporal logic. She moved to Synopsys, from 2009 to 2013.

In 2013 she returned to academia. She became a visiting fellow at Yale University from 2013 to 2016, and a research scientist at the University of Pennsylvania from 2014 to 2016. At the University of Pennsylvania she was associate director of a project on program synthesis headed by Rajeev Alur. In 2016 she obtained a position as assistant professor of computer science at Ben-Gurion University, and in 2021 she was promoted to associate professor.

== Book ==
Fisman is coauthor, with Cindy Eisner, of the book A Practical Introduction to PSL (Springer, 2006).
