= Nestlé Deutschland =

German subsidiary of Nestlé

Nestlé Deutschland AG is the German subsidiary company of the food multinational company Nestlé. It is one of Germany's main food companies.

== History ==
The company was formed in 1970 as a subsidiary of Nestlé S.A, known as Nestlé Alimentana AG. In the early 1980s it was known as Nestlé Gruppe Deutschland GmbH; in 1987 this became Nestlé Deutschland AG.

In the 1970s, Rowntree Mackintosh set up a chocolate (Schokolade) factory in Germany to make Kit Kat, with a separate German division of the company. In 1988, the British Rowntree Mackintosh Confectionery was taken over by the Swiss parent company; in 1989 the German division of Rowntree Mackintosh GmbH became part of Nestlé Deutschland AG. The German factory also makes After Eight and Smarties.

Angela Merkel and Paul Bulcke, the Nestlé chief executive, opened the Nestlé Werk Schwerin factory, in Schwerin, Mecklenburg-Vorpommern (former East Germany or German Democratic Republic).

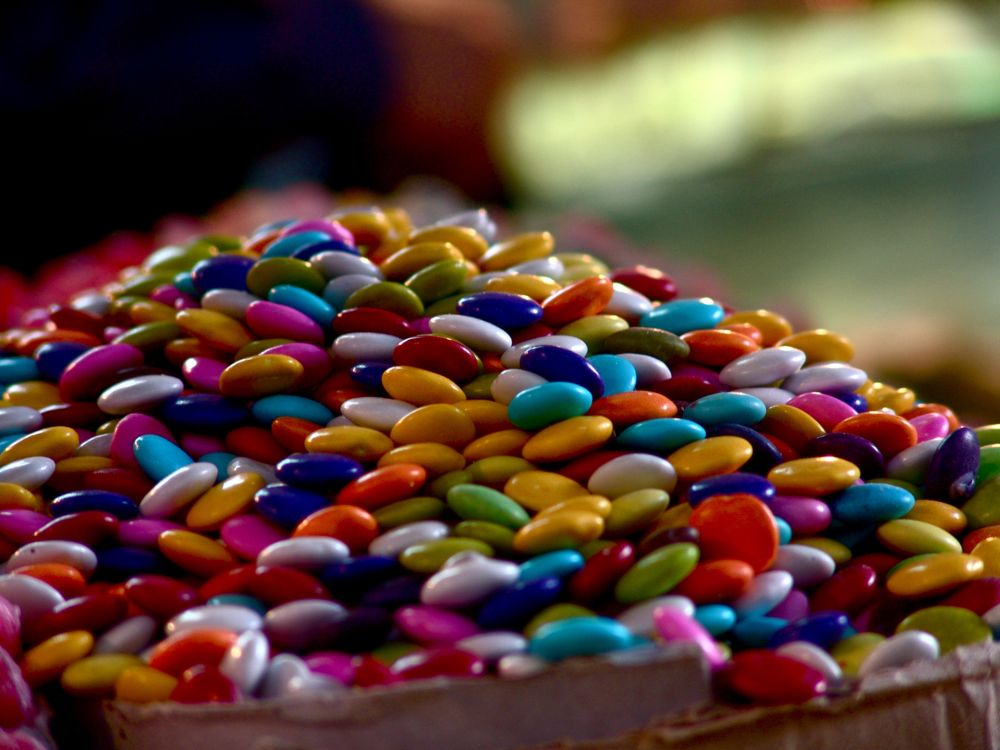
Smarties are no longer made in the UK since 2006, they are made in Germany

== Products ==
- Its ice-cream company Schöller GmbH is number two (die Nummer zwei) in Germany.

== Structure ==
It is headquartered in Frankfurt am Main, in the Niederrad district on the south side of the river, close to the west side of the Bundesautobahn 5. The Mechanical Engineering Industry Association (VDMA) is close to the north in the commercial area known as Bürostadt Niederrad. It is accessed on the S-Bahn by the Frankfurt Niederrad station.

The chief executive (Vorsitzende), since July 2015, of the company is Béatrice Guillaume-Grabisch (born in Paris on 26 May 1964).

== See also ==
- SSP Deutschland
