= Mariëlle Stoelinga =

Dutch computer scientist and full professor

- Citizenship: Dutch
- Education: Computing Science Institute, Nijmegen (Ph.D.); Radboud University Nijmegen (M.Sc.)
- Awards: ICALP 2003, best paper; EASST 2016, best paper; AAAI 2022, best paper; CONCUR 2022, test-of-time
- Scientific career
- Fields: Computer Science; Risk Management; Predictive maintenance; Model checking
- Workplaces: University of Twente (faculty); Radboud University Nijmegen (faculty); University of California, Santa Cruz (postdoc)
- Website: wwwhome.ewi.utwente.nl/~marielle/

Mariëlle I. A. Stoelinga is a Dutch computer scientist based in the Netherlands. She is full professor of Risk Management for High Tech Systems in the Formal Methods & Tools Group at the University of Twente, Enschede, the Netherlands and holds a partial appointment as a full professor in the Software Science department at the Radboud University, Nijmegen. She is also director of Life Long Learning at the Faculty of Electrical Engineering, Mathematics and Computer Science, at the University of Twente.

== Education ==
Stoelinga obtained her degree in Mathematics & Computer Science at the University of Nijmegen, with a specialization in foundations of mathematics and computer science. Her Master’s thesis covered the topic of Exact Representations of and Computability on Real Numbers, under the supervision of Erik Barendsen and Henk Barendregt.

In 2001 she obtained her PhD at the Computing Science Institute in Nijmegen, the Netherlands, supervised by Frits Vaandrager, with a thesis titled: Alea Jacta est: Verification of Probabilistic, Real–Time and Parametric Systems.

== Research ==
Mariëlle Stoelinga in a public lecture on Risk Management

Stoelinga main area of research deals with quantitative risk assessment methods to ensure that the risks associated with high technology systems are within acceptable limits. She develops techniques for analyzing, predicting and improving the reliability of complex systems using fault trees, model-based testing and architectural reliability modelling.

A distinguishing feature of techniques developed by Stoelinga is compositionality, as she derives the risk profile of a complex system from the risk profiles of its components, using techniques from model checking.

This approach is applied in the field of predictive maintenance and on the interactions between safety and (cyber)security, as testified by her recently granted projects: PrimaVera, CAESAR and ZORRO.

== Career ==
From December 2001 to April 2004, Stoelinga worked as a Post-doc researcher in Computer Engineering at the University of California, Santa Cruz, USA, with Prof. Luca de Alfaro.

From August 2005 to September 2005 she was a visiting researcher at the University of California, Santa Cruz, and starting May 2004 she was an assistant professor in the Formal Methods & Tools Group, at the University of Twente, where she now holds a full professor position alongside a partial appointment as a full professor at the Radboud University, Nijmegen, in the Software Science department.

In 2019, she received a substantial grant from the Dutch Research Council (NWO). She also received an ERC Consolidator Grant from the European Research Council. With the NWO grant, she is leading a team of industrialists and academics to better integrate the various steps in predictive maintenance. With the ERC grant, Stoelinga is developing new methods for better and more integrated assessment of safety and (cyber)security. Furthermore, Stoelinga recently received another grant from the Dutch Research Council (NWO) for the ZORRO Project: Engineering for Zero Downtime in Cyber-Physical Systems via Intelligent Diagnostics.
