= Doron A. Peled =

Israeli computer scientist

- דורון אנשל פלד
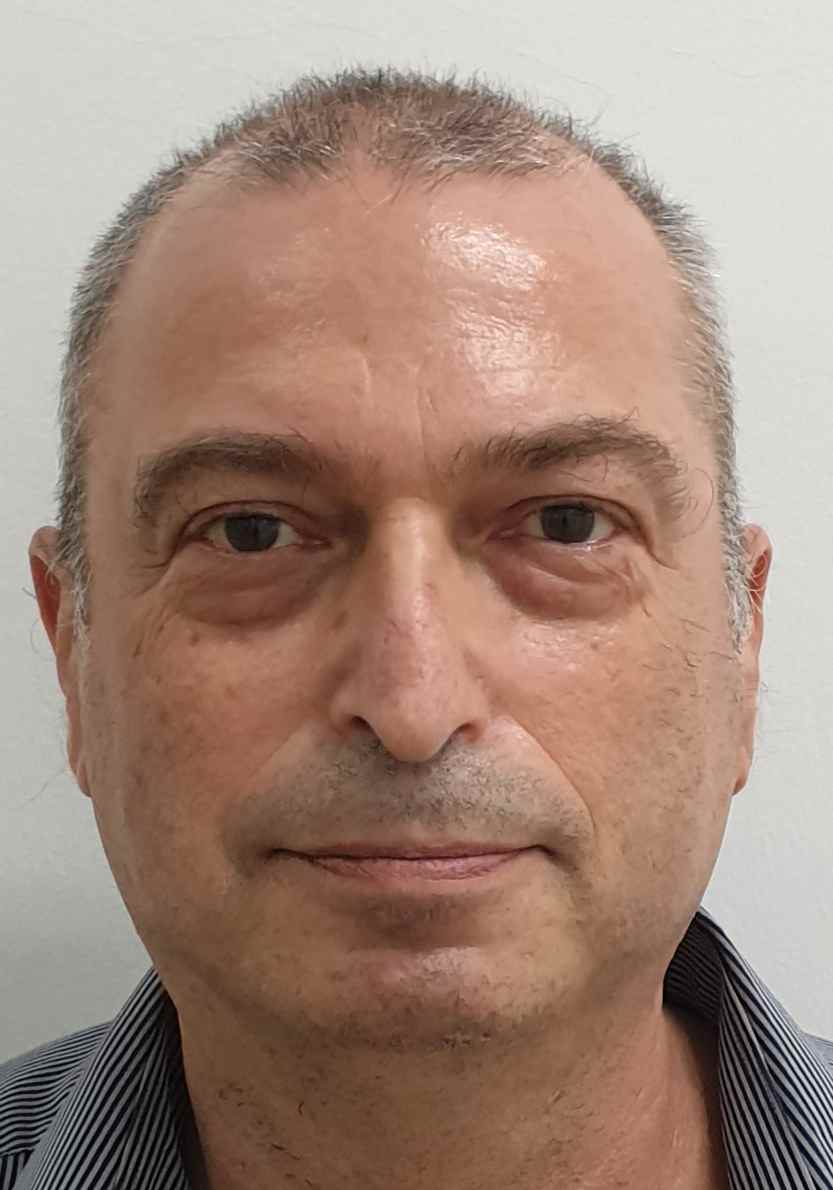
- Born: April 10, 1962 (age 64); Haifa, Israel
- Citizenship: Israeli
- Education: Technion – Israel Institute of Technology
- Known for: Partial order reduction
- Awards: CAV Award 2014
- Scientific career
- Fields: Formal Methods, Model checking, program synthesis, runtime verification
- Workplaces: Bar-Ilan University; University of Texas at Austin; University of Warwick; Bell Labs
- Doctoral advisor: Shmuel Katz, Amir Pnueli

Doron A. Peled (Hebrew: דורון אנשל פלד; born 1962) is a computer science Professor at Bar-Ilan University. His research interests include formal methods, model checking, program synthesis and runtime verification. With Edmund M. Clarke and Orna Grumberg, he is the coauthor of the book Model Checking (MIT Press, 1999) and the author of the book Software Reliability Methods (Springer Verlag, 2000).

== Biography ==
Doron Peled was born on April 10, 1962 in Haifa. He obtained his D.Sc in computer science from the Technion – Israel Institute of Technology in 1991 under the supervision of Prof. Shmuel Katz and Prof. Amir Pnueli on verification methods in temporal logic. After a post-doctoral year at the University of Warwick, he joined Bell Labs, where he worked between 1992 and 2001. He was then appointed as an associate professor at the University of Texas at Austin and after a year to a professor and chair of software engineering at the University of Warwick.

In 2006 Doron returned to Israel and joined Bar-Ilan University as a professor of computer science. He served as the department chair between 2013 and 2016.

== Research ==
Peled is known for his contribution in computer science in the area of formal methods. This includes partial order reduction, which is a method for reducing the time and space required to automatically verify a concurrent system, for which he received the 2014 CAV award with Patrice Godefroid, Antti Valmari and Pierre Wolper. Together with Mihalis Yannakakis and Moshe Vardi he developed black box checking, a method for automatically verifying black box systems. Together with Klaus Havelund he developed the tool DejaVu for the runtime verification of sequences of events with lots of data.

== Books ==
- Clarke, Edmund M.; Grumberg, Orna; Peled, Doron A. (1999). Model Checking. Cambridge, Mass: MIT Press. ISBN 9780262032704.
- Peled, Doron (2001). Software Reliability Methods. New York: Springer. ISBN 978-0-387-95106-5.
