= Bernhard Steffen (computer scientist) =

German computer scientist

Bernhard Steffen (born 31 May 1958 in Kiel, West Germany) is a German computer scientist and professor at the TU Dortmund University, Germany. His research focuses on various facets of formal methods ranging from program analysis and verification, to workflow synthesis, to test-based modeling, and machine learning.

After his PhD at the University of Kiel supervised by Hans Langmaack, Steffen spent two years as a research fellow at the LFCS (University of Edinburgh, Scotland) where he co-developed the Edinburgh Concurrency Workbench and authored one of the earliest papers on how to adequately model probabilistic processes, before joining the University of Aarhus in 1989 in a postdoc position. From 1990 to 1992, he was an associate professor at the RWTH Aachen, before he became full professor at the University of Passau. Since 1997, he has held the chair of programming systems at TU Dortmund University where he was Dean of Computer Science between 2002 and 2006 as well as a member of the Senate in 2006 and 2007. In Dortmund, he developed the concept of active automata learning towards a practical means for model-based testing that does not require any a priori models. Recently his interest shifted towards the application of formal methods for explaining machine learning.

His conceptual background comprises abstract interpretation, computer-aided verification and explanation, automata learning, and the development of domain-specific languages that guarantee properties by design. This is witnessed by receiving the Most Influential PLDI Paper Award for Lazy Code Motion, which is given 10 years in retrospective, and the CAV Artifact Award for the Open-Source LearnLib. Finally, in 2019, he was awarded the title of Honorary Professor of the Amity School of Engineering and Technology.

Furthermore, Steffen is founding editor-in-chief of the International Journal on Software Tools for Technology Transfer (STTT), co-founder of TACAS, ETAPS, ISoLA, RERS and member of the editorial board of the Springer LNCS series.

== Journal and conference foundations ==
Bernhard Steffen co-founded the following journals and conferences:

- Tools and Algorithms for the Construction and Analysis of Systems (TACAS)
- European Joint Conferences on Theory and Practice of Software (ETAPS)
- International Symposium on Leveraging Applications of Formal Methods, Verification and Validation (ISoLA)
- International Journal on Software Tools for Technology Transfer (STTT)
