= European Symposium on Programming =

Annual conference regarding programming

- Abbreviation: ESOP
- Discipline: Programming Languages

Publication details
- Publisher: Lecture Notes in Computer Science
- History: 1986-present
- Frequency: Annually
- Open access: Yes

The European Symposium on Programming (ESOP) is an annual conference devoted to fundamental issues in the specification, design, analysis, and implementation of programming languages and systems.

- According to CORE Ranking, ESOP has rank A (i.e. "excellent conference, and highly respected in a discipline area", top 14%).
- According to Google Scholar Metrics (as of 20 July 2019), ESOP has H5-index 26 and H5-median 38.

Initially a biannual conference, ESOP moved in 1998 into an annual schedule and became one of the founding conferences of the European Joint Conferences on Theory and Practice of Software (ETAPS).

== See also ==
- List of computer science conferences
- List of computer science conference acronyms
- Outline of computer science
