= Robert L. Constable =

American computer scientist

- Born: Robert Lee Constable; 1942 (age 83–84)
- Citizenship: United States
- Education: A.B. Princeton (1964); M.A. Wisconsin (1965); Ph.D. Wisconsin (1968)
- Known for: Nuprl
- Scientific career
- Fields: Computer Science
- Workplaces: Cornell University
- Doctoral advisor: Stephen Kleene
- Doctoral students: Allan Borodin; Edmund M. Clarke; Robert Harper; Kurt Mehlhorn; Steven Muchnick; David Basin

Robert Lee Constable (born 1942) is an American computer scientist. He is a professor of computer science and first and former dean of the Faculty of Computing and Information Science at Cornell University. He is known for his work on connecting computer programs and mathematical proofs, especially the Nuprl system. Prior to Nuprl, he worked on the PL/CV formal system and verifier. Alonzo Church supervised Constable's junior thesis while he was studying in Princeton. Constable received his PhD in 1968 under Stephen Kleene and has supervised over 40 students.

Constable has been a director of the Marktoberdorf Summer School.

== Selected publications ==
- R. L. Constable and M. J. O'Donnell. A Programming Logic, Winthrop, Cambridge, 1978.
- R. L. Constable, S. D. Johnson and C. D. Eichenlaub. An Introduction to the PL/CV2 Programming Logic. In Lecture Notes in Computer Science 135, Springer-Verlag, 1982
- PRL Group. Implementing Mathematics with the Nuprl Proof Development System. Prentice-Hall, Engelwood Cliffs, NJ, 1986.

== Development of the Cornell FCIS ==
In 1999, Cornell created the Faculty of Computing and Information Science, or FCIS, as a college-level entity with a dean but without the administrative structure of a college. Students and faculty had homes in other colleges; faculty would have joint appointments. For example, in 2002, Computer Science faculty were placed in both Engineering and FCIS. The new FCIS became the umbrella organization for the Program of Computer Graphics and, later, a new Department of Statistical Science. FCIS grew to have more than 50 affiliated faculty, each with a joint appointment in another academic department. In 2020, with a financial commitment made by Ann S Bowers, it became the Cornell Bowers CIS (College of Computing and Information Science).

FCIS was the vision of Robert Constable. He felt that all parts of Cornell would need help using computing in research and teaching in this new computer age, and that required raising computing to the college level. He proposed this new, innovative way, a "faculty" that was structurally a college —but not a real college— headed by a dean. Constable worked over several years to bring this idea to fruition. He was the founding dean and served two five-year terms. In 2008, when he stepped down as chair, then Provost Biddy Martin attributed both the idea and its implementation to Constable.

A second innovation was a Department of Information Science that would work hand-in-hand with, and not in opposition to, Computer Science —note that IS is in the title FCIS. Constable gave appropriate members of Computer Science the responsibility of developing the new department over the years. Today, in 2024, the IS Department offers majors and minors in all of Cornell's undergrad colleges. Several faculty members are joint with CS and IS. (Note: At least four faculty have had joint appointments in Computer Science and Information Science and had leading roles in both departments. In 2023, here is the list of Computer Science faculty and the Information Science faculty.)

== Awards ==
- ACM Fellow, 1995.
- Guggenheim Fellowship, 1990-1991.
- Herbrand Award for Distinguished Contributions to Automated Reasoning, 2014.
