= NATO Science for Peace and Security =

NATO Science for Peace and Security (SPS) Programme
- Field: Science and technology
- Predecessor: NATO Science Committee (SCOM); NATO Committee on the Challenges of Modern Society (CCMS)
- Parent entity: NATO Innovation, Hybrid and Cyber (IHC) Division
- Headquarters: NATO Headquarters, Brussels, Belgium
- Website: www.nato.int/science

Science for Peace and Security (SPS) is a NATO programme supporting non-military cooperation focused on scientific research, technological innovation and knowledge exchange. The SPS Programme in its current form was established in 2006, building on over 60 years of scientific cooperation at NATO.

SPS offers funding, expert advice and support to tailor-made and security-relevant activities that enable cooperation among scientists, researchers and government officials in NATO member states and NATO partner countries. A distinctive feature of the Programme is that every activity it funds requires the involvement of at least two entities, one in a NATO member state and one in an eligible NATO partner country, who must work together to address shared security challenges.

The Programme's funding opportunities are announced via calls for proposals posted on its website up to three times a year. SPS supports four types of grants: research and development Multi-Year Projects, Advanced Research Workshops, Advanced Training Courses, and Advanced Study Institutes.

== Thematic focus ==
The SPS Programme's focus is set by a list of thematic priorities agreed by NATO members. In April 2024, SPS announced the adoption of a revised list of thematic priorities to strengthen its alignment with NATO's strategic outlook and partnership priorities.

In line with its revised list of priorities, the SPS Programme supports activities that address at least one of the following thematic areas:

- Environment, Climate Change and Security
- Energy Security
- Innovation and Emerging Disruptive Technologies (EDTs)
- Counter-terrorism
- Chemical, Biological, Radiological, and Nuclear (CBRN) and Explosive Hazards Management
- Defence against Hybrid Threats
- Resilience
- Critical Underwater Infrastructure
- Cyber Defence
- Assessing and addressing threats posed by the Russian Federation
- Strategic Foresight
- Human and Social Aspects of Security
- Operational Support
- Other proposals linked to the implementation of NATO's core tasks

== Examples of SPS activities ==
- "SAPIENCE" is a project involving four teams from universities in the Netherlands, United Kingdom, United States, and Austria in a series of competitions. In simulated disaster scenarios, participants must overcome technical challenges of increasing complexity by employing teams of autonomous drones.
- "Hybrid space and submarine architecture to Ensure the Information Security of Telecommunications (HEIST)" is a project launched in 2024 aimed at rerouting the internet to space in the event of subsea cable attacks.
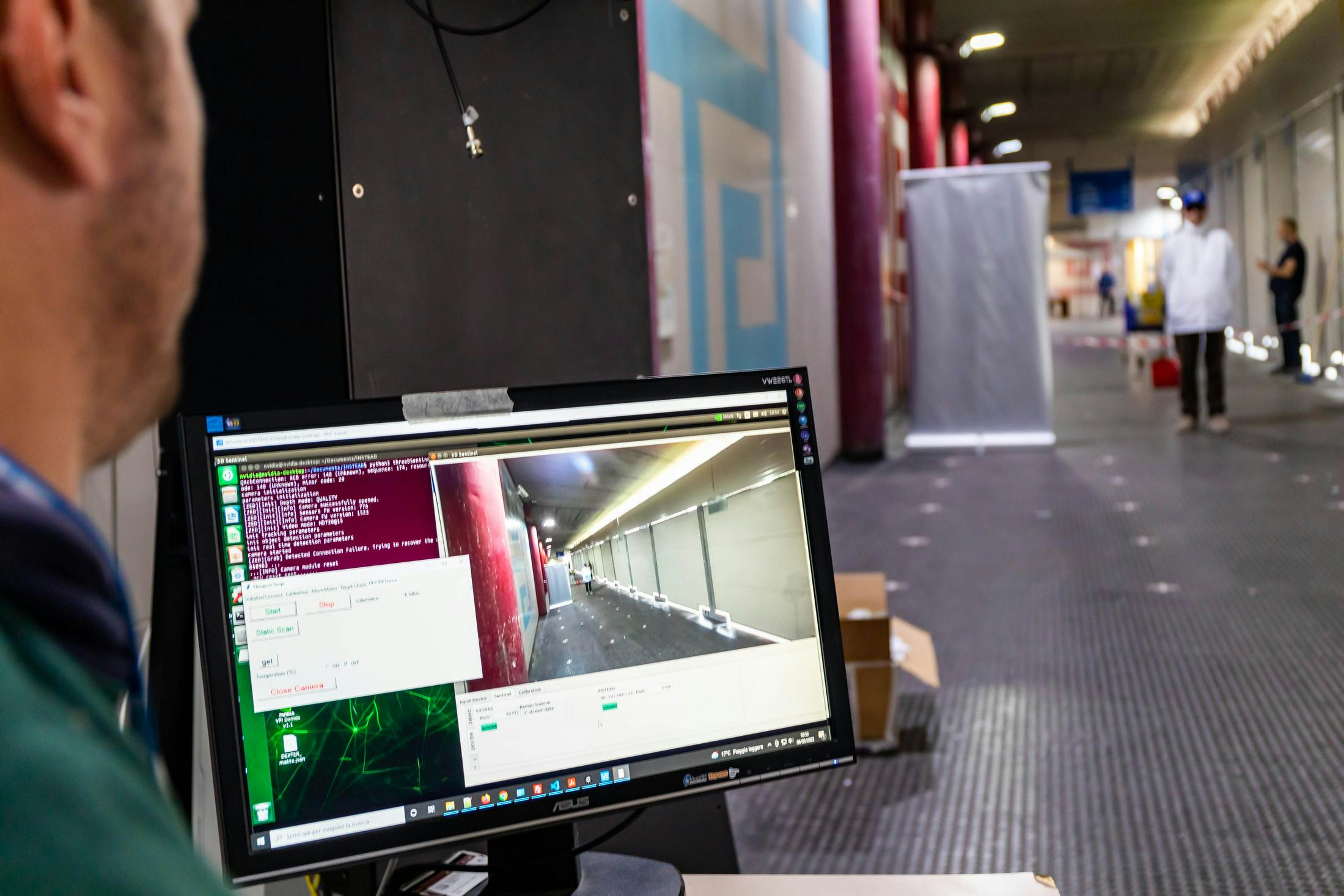
  Demonstration and testing of the DEXTER technology in a subway station in Rome, Italy in May 2022.
- "DEXTER" was a project involving 11 laboratories in 8 countries in the development of an integrated and affordable sensor-fusion system able to detect explosives and firearms in public places, remotely and in real time.
- The project "Next-Generation Incident Command System (NICS)" developed and implemented a system to facilitate coordination among first responders across the Western Balkans during natural disasters and other incidents.
- The project "Demining Robots" brought together researchers from universities in Italy, Jordan, Ukraine, and the United States, who demonstrated the feasibility of a safe landmine and Improvised Explosive Device (IED) detection system relying on a team of cooperative robotic vehicles, each carrying specialized sensors.
- The Summer School Marktoberdorf is an Advanced Study Institute focusing on computer science which received support from the SPS Programme on multiple occasions.
- Researchers in Belgium, Jordan, Morocco, and the United Kingdom collaborated on the project "Responding to Emerging Security Challenges in NATO's Southern Neighbourhood", which analysed the main geopolitical, socioeconomic and energy-related challenges in the area, developing three alternative future scenarios for the region out to 2030.
- South Caucasus River Monitoring—assess pollutants and radionuclides in the Kura and Araks rivers, shared by Azerbaijan, Armenia, and Georgia.
- Preparation of handbooks on environmental aspects of military compounds (safe drinking water, waste management, energy supply).
- Virtual Silk Highway—satellite-based broadband technology for universities and civil research institutions in the South Caucasus and Central Asia.
- Safe conversion of mélange (a highly toxic rocket fuel oxidizer left from the Cold War era) in Central Asia.

== See also ==
- Foreign relations of NATO
- Major non-NATO ally
- Partnership for Peace
