= Extended Semantic Web Conference =

ESWC conference series

- Abbreviation: ESWC
- Discipline: Semantic Web

Publication details
- Publisher: Springer-Verlag
- History: 2004–present
- Frequency: Annual
- Open access: no
- Website: https://eswc-conferences.org/

The European Semantic Web Conference (abbreviated as ESWC) is a yearly international academic conference on the topic of the Semantic Web. The event began in 2004, as the European Semantic Web Symposium. The goal of the event is "to bring together researchers and practitioners dealing with different aspects of semantics on the Web".

Starting in 2026, ESWC officially came under the stewardship of SWSA (transitioning from STI International).

Topics covered at the conference include linked data, machine learning, natural language processing and information retrieval, ontologies, reasoning, semantic data management, services, processes, and cloud computing, social Web and Web science, in-use and industrial, digital libraries and cultural heritage, and e-government.

== List of conferences ==
Past and future ESWC conferences include:

Year	Conference	City	Country	Proceedings	Awards
2027	ESWC2027	Limassol	Cyprus		
2026	ESWC2026	Dubrovnik	Croatia	LNCS vol. 16549, LNCS vol. 16550	
2025	ESWC2025	Portorož	Slovenia	LNCS vol. 15718, LNCS vol. 15719	
2024	ESWC2024	Hersonissos	Greece	LNCS vol. 14664, LNCS vol. 14665	
2023	ESWC2023	Hersonissos	Greece	LNCS vol. 13870	
2022	ESWC2022	Hersonissos	Greece		Best Paper: Never Mind the Semantic Gap: Modular, Lazy and Safe Loading of RDF Data by Eduard Kamburjan, Vidar Norstein Klungre, and Martin Giese Best Student Paper: The Problem with XSD Binary Floating Point Datatypes in RDF by Jan Martin Keil & Merle Gänßinger
2021	ESWC2021		Online	LNCS vol. 12731	
2020	ESWC2020	Heraklion	Greece	LNCS vol. 12123	
2019	ESWC2019	Portorož	Slovenia	LNCS vol. 11503	Best Paper: Hai Huang and Fabien Gandon: Learning URI Selection Criteria to Improve the Crawling of Linked Open Data Best Student Paper: Matthäus Zloch, Maribel Acosta, Daniel Hienert, Stefan Dietze and Stefan Conrad: A Software Framework and Datasets for the Analysis of Graph Measures on RDF Graphs
2018	ESWC2018	Heraklion	Greece	LNCS vol. 10843	
2017	ESWC2017	Portorož	Slovenia	LNCS vol. 10249, LNCS vol. 10250	Best Paper: Patrik Schneider, Thomas Eiter and Josiane Xavier Parreira: Spatial Ontology-Mediated Query Answering over Mobility Streams Best Student Paper: Sarven Capadisli, Amy Guy, Christoph Lange, Sören Auer and Tim Berners-Lee: Linked Data Notifications
2016	ESWC2016	Anissaras, Crete	Greece		Best Paper: Géraud Fokou, Stéphane Jean, Allel Hadjali, and Michael Baron: RDF Query Relaxation Strategies Based on Failure Causes
2013	ESWC2013	Montpellier	France	LNCS vol. 7882	Best Paper: Axel-Cyrille Ngonga Ngomo, Lars Kolb, Norman Heino, Michael Hartung, Sören Auer and Erhard Rahm: When to Reach for the Cloud: Using Parallel Hardware for Link Discovery Elena Cabrio, Serena Villata and Fabien Gandon: A Support Framework for Argumentative Discussions Management in the Web
2012	ESWC2012	Heraklion	Greece	LNCS vol. 7295	Best Paper: Uta Lösch, Stephan Bloehdorn, Achim Rettinger: Graph Kernels for RDF Data
2011	ESWC2011	Heraklion	Greece	LNCS vol. 6643, LNCS vol. 6644	Best Paper: Carlos Buil Aranda, Oscar Corcho and Marcelo Arenas: Semantics and optimization of the SPARQL 1.1 federation extension
2010	ESWC2010	Heraklion	Greece	LNCS vol. 6088, LNCS vol. 6089	Best Paper: Jan Noessner, Mathias Niepert, Christian Meilicke and Heiner Stuckenschmidt: Leveraging Terminological Structure for Object Reconciliation
2009	ESWC2009	Heraklion	Greece	LNCS vol. 5554	Best Paper: Olaf Hartig: Querying Trust in RDF Data with tSPARQL
2008	ESWC2008	Tenerife	Spain	LNCS vol. 5021	
2007	ESWC2007	Innsbruck	Austria		
2006	ESWC2006	Budva	Montenegro		
2005	ESWC2005	Heraklion	Greece	LNCS vol. 3532	
2004	ESWS2004	Heraklion	Greece		
