= Orna Kupferman =

Israeli computer scientist

- אורנה קופרמן
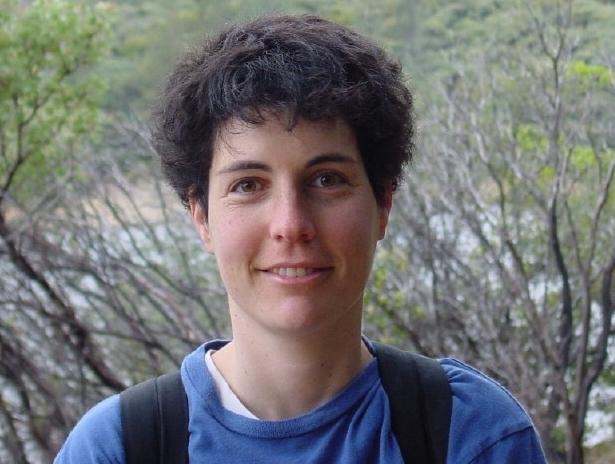
- Education: Technion - Israel Institute of Technology
- Scientific career
- Workplaces: Hebrew University of Jerusalem; University of California, Berkeley; Bell Labs
- Thesis: Model Checking for Branching-Time Temporal Logics (1995)
- Doctoral advisor: Orna Grumberg
- Website: Kupferman Group

Orna Kupferman (Hebrew: אורנה קופפרמן) is a Professor of Computer Science and former Vice Rector at the Hebrew University of Jerusalem. She was elected to the Academia Europaea in 2016.

== Early life and education ==
Kupferman served in the Israel Defense Force from 1986 to 1988. She earned her PhD at the Technion in 1995, where she was supervised by Orna Grumberg. In 1996 Kupferman joined the technical staff at Bell Labs. She moved to University of California, Berkeley in 1997, working with Thomas Henzinger.

== Research and career ==
In 1998 Kupferman was appointed a Senior Lecturer at the Hebrew University of Jerusalem. She acted as Head of Computer Science from 2005 to 2008, and as Head of Engineering between 2008 and 2011. She was made a Full Professor in 2008. In 2012 Kupferman was awarded a European Research Council grant to study high-quality reactive systems. She is developing formal verification and synthesis computer systems for both hardware and software. She uses automata theory approaches to check branching-time models.

Kupferman has served as the Advisor on Gender Issues for the President of the Hebrew University of Jerusalem. She has spoken about the challenges achieving gender balance in academia at the Weizmann Institute of Science. She called for the Hebrew University of Jerusalem to end gender segregated education.

Kupferman was elected to the Academia Europaea in 2016. She was also awarded the Hebrew University of Jerusalem Michael Milken Prize for long-standing Excellence in Teaching.

Kupferman has served on the editorial board of Formal Methods in System Design and Logical Methods in Computer Science. She is Editor-in-Chief of ACM Transactions on Computational Logic.

=== Selected publications ===
- Kupferman, Orna (September 2002). "Alternating-time temporal logic". Journal of the ACM. 49 (5): 672–713. doi:10.1145/585265.585270. S2CID 15984608. Archived from the original on July 11, 2010.
- Kupferman, Orna (March 2000). "An automata-theoretic approach to branching-time model checking". Journal of the ACM. 47 (2): 312–360. doi:10.1145/333979.333987. S2CID 1216035.
- Kupferman, Orna (May 1999). "Alternating-time Temporal Logic". Compositionality: The Significant Difference. Lecture Notes in Computer Science. Vol. 1536. pp. 23–60. doi:10.1007/3-540-49213-5_2. ISBN 978-3-540-65493-3.
