= Javier Esparza (computer scientist) =

Spanish computer scientist

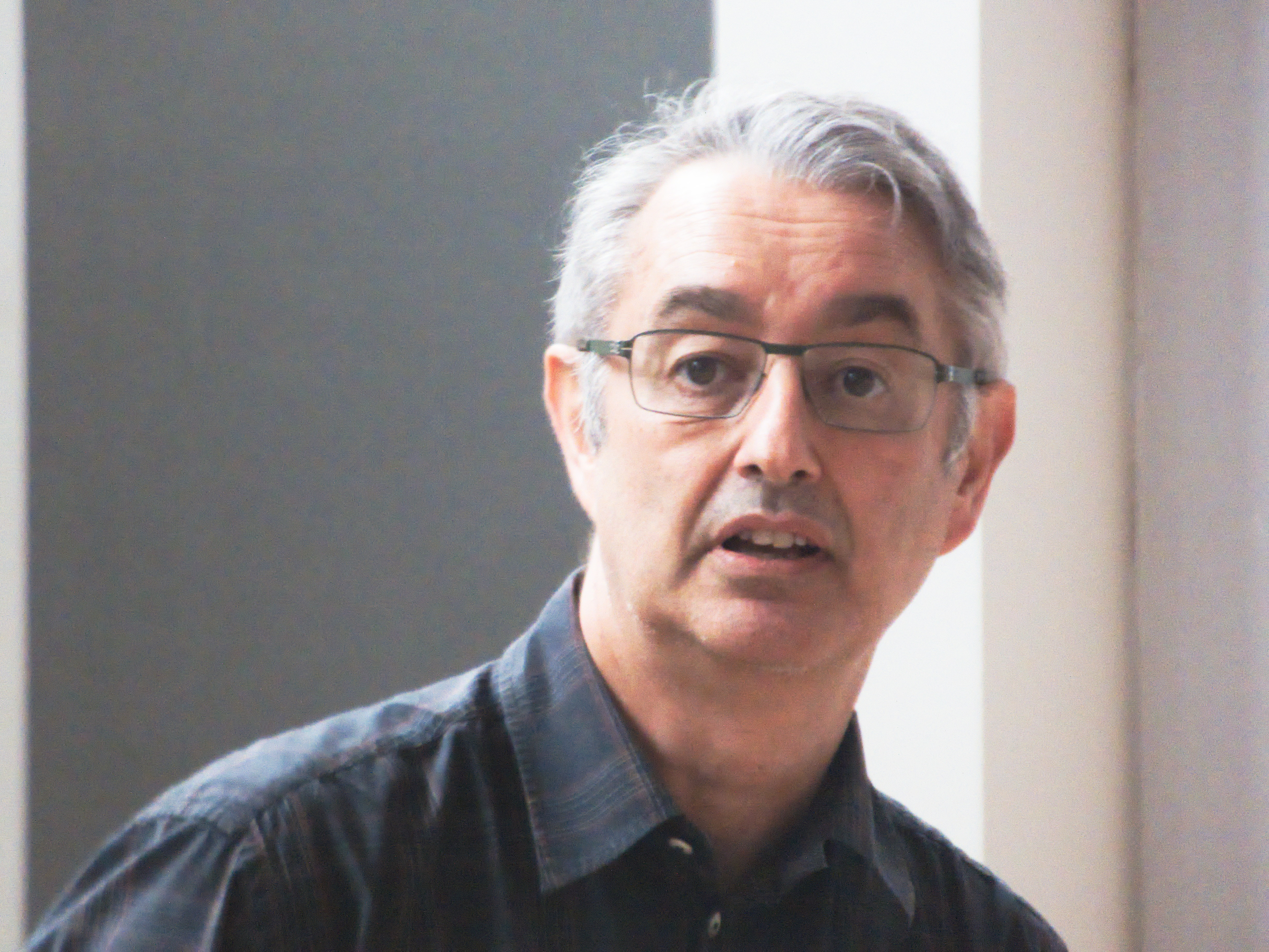
- Born: 27 April 1964 (age 62); Pamplona, Spain
- Awards: ERC Advanced Grant, awarded 2018; Honorary Doctorate, Masaryk University, awarded 2009; Member of Academia Europaea, elected 2011; Fellow of the ACM, class of 2025
- Scientific career
- Fields: Computer science; Concurrency theory
- Workplaces: Technical University of Munich
- Website: www7.in.tum.de/~esparza/

Francisco Javier Esparza Estaun (born 27 April 1964 in Pamplona, Spain) is a Spanish computer scientist. He is a professor at the Technical University of Munich.

== Education ==
Javier Esparza Estaun received his Master of Science degree in Theoretical Physics from the University of Zaragoza (1987). He earned his Doctoral degree (PhD) in Computer Science (1990, on free-choice Petri nets) from the same university. He habilitated 1994 at the University of Hildesheim on the subject of Petri net unfoldings.

== Career ==
During his habilitation and in the period afterwards, Javier Esparza's focus was on concurrency theory and the theory of Petri nets. He made important contributions to Petri net structure theory and to the unfolding approach, initially proposed by Kenneth L. McMillan, and he is the co-author of two books on these subjects.

After his habilitation, he was employed as an associate professor at the Technical University of Munich (1994–2001). He was then successively Chair of Theoretical Computer Science at the University of Edinburgh (2001–2003) and Chair of Software Reliability and Security at the Universität Stuttgart (2003–2007). Since 2007, he holds the chair for Foundations of Software Reliability and Theoretical Computer Science, again at the Technical University of Munich.

He has also made contributions to the automata-theoretic approach to software model checking, to program analysis, and to the verification of infinite-state systems. More recently, his work has focused on the verification of parametrised and stochastic systems. He has published over 250 peer-reviewed scientific papers in the aforementioned fields, as well as a book on an algorithmic approach to automata theory (coauthored with Michael Blondin.) Multiple software verification tools have been developed by his group, such as Moped and jMoped, Rabinizer, Strix, and Peregrine. He received an Advanced Grant from the European Research Council in 2018 and has been Principal Investigator of more than 20 research projects, most of them collaborative in an international context. He has frequently been invited as a speaker at Computer Science conferences and has served as a Chair or a member of various professional Program, Steering and Selection Committees.

== Awards and honours ==
Javier Esparza has been awarded an honorary doctorate in Informatics from the Masaryk University of Brno, Czech Republic, in 2009, and he is an elected member of Academia Europaea since 2011. He received the CONCUR Test-of Time Award 2021 for his paper Reachability Analysis of Pushdown Automata: Application to Model-checking (co-authored with Ahmed Bouajjani and Oded Maler); several best paper awards at conferences; multiple times a Best Teaching prize at the Technical University of Munich; and a Dissertation Prize of Universidad de Zaragoza (1990). He was named as an ACM Fellow, in the 2025 class of fellows, "for contributions to the theory of program verification and concurrent systems".
