= Orna Grumberg =

Israeli computer scientist

- ארנה גרימברג
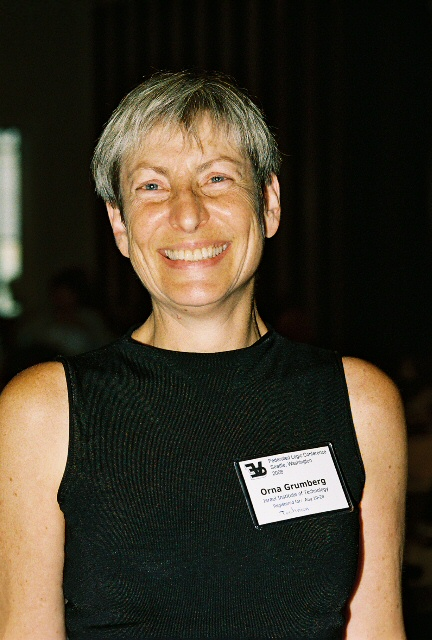
- Grumberg (2006)
- Born: April 30, 1952 (age 73); Hadera, Israel
- Known for: Model checking
- Awards: Fellow of the Association for Computing Machinery (2015), Honorary Doctorate from the Technical University of Munich (2017)
- Scientific career
- Fields: Computer Science
- Institutions: Technion – Israel Institute of Technology

Orna Grumberg (Hebrew: ארנה גרימברג; born April 30, 1952, in Hadera near Haifa) is an Israeli computer scientist and academic, the Leumi Chair of Science at the Technion.

Grumberg is noted for developing model checking, a method for formally verifying hardware and software designs. With Edmund M. Clarke and Doron A. Peled, she is the author of the book Model Checking (MIT Press, 1999).

In 2013, Grumberg was elected to the Academia Europaea. In 2015, she was named a Fellow of the Association for Computing Machinery "for contributions to research in automated formal verification of hardware and software systems." In May 2017, she was awarded an honorary doctorate by the Technical University of Munich as part of the 50th anniversary of computer science in Munich.
