= Marktoberdorf =

- Town
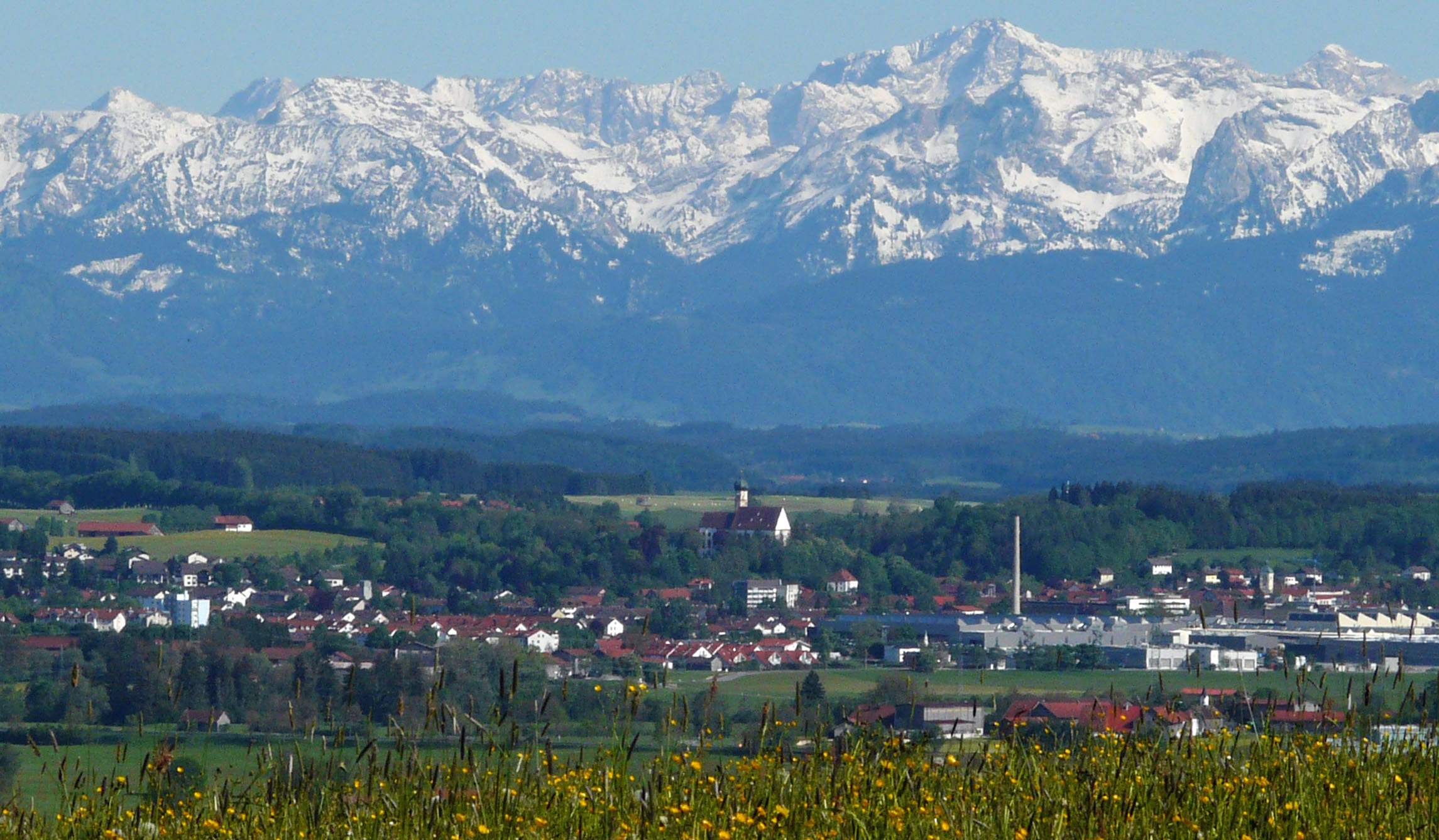
- Marktoberdorf

- Coat of arms

- Location of Marktoberdorf within Ostallgäu district
- Interactive map of Marktoberdorf
- Location within Germany Location within Bavaria
- Coordinates: 47°46′N 10°37′E
- Country: Germany
- State: Bavaria
- Admin. region: Schwaben
- District: Ostallgäu

Government
  - Mayor (2020–26): Wolfgang Hell (CSU)

Area
  - Total: 95.15 km^{2} (36.74 sq mi)
- Elevation: 727–790 m (2,385–2,592 ft)

Population (2025-12-31)
  - Total: 18,463
  - Density: 194.0/km^{2} (502.6/sq mi)
- Time zone: UTC+01:00 (CET)
  - Summer (DST): UTC+02:00 (CEST)
- Postal codes: 87616
- Dialling codes: 08342
- Vehicle registration: OAL, FÜS, MOD
- Website: www.marktoberdorf.de

Marktoberdorf (German: [maʁktˈʔoːbɐdɔʁf]) is the capital of the Bavarian district of Ostallgäu in the Regierungsbezirk of Swabia.

Marktoberdorf is near the town of Kempten, Füssen, known for the castle Neuschwanstein, Bad Wörishofen, and Schongau. The nearest larger city is Kaufbeuren, eleven kilometers away.

Marktoberdorf plays host to the International Chamber Choir Competition Marktoberdorf every two years. In computer science, it is known for its hosting of the annual International Summer School Marktoberdorf every year since 1970. This Advanced Study Institute of the NATO Security Through Science Committee (now NATO Science for Peace) and the computer science department of the Technical University of Munich is a two-week course for young computer scientists and mathematicians working in the field of formal systems' development. Students are accommodated in the boarding house of the local high school, Gymnasium Marktoberdorf.

Marktoberdorf is home to the tractor manufacturer Fendt, where its founder Xaver Fendt was born.

== Notable residents ==
- Kevin Volland (born 1992), association football player

== Gallery ==
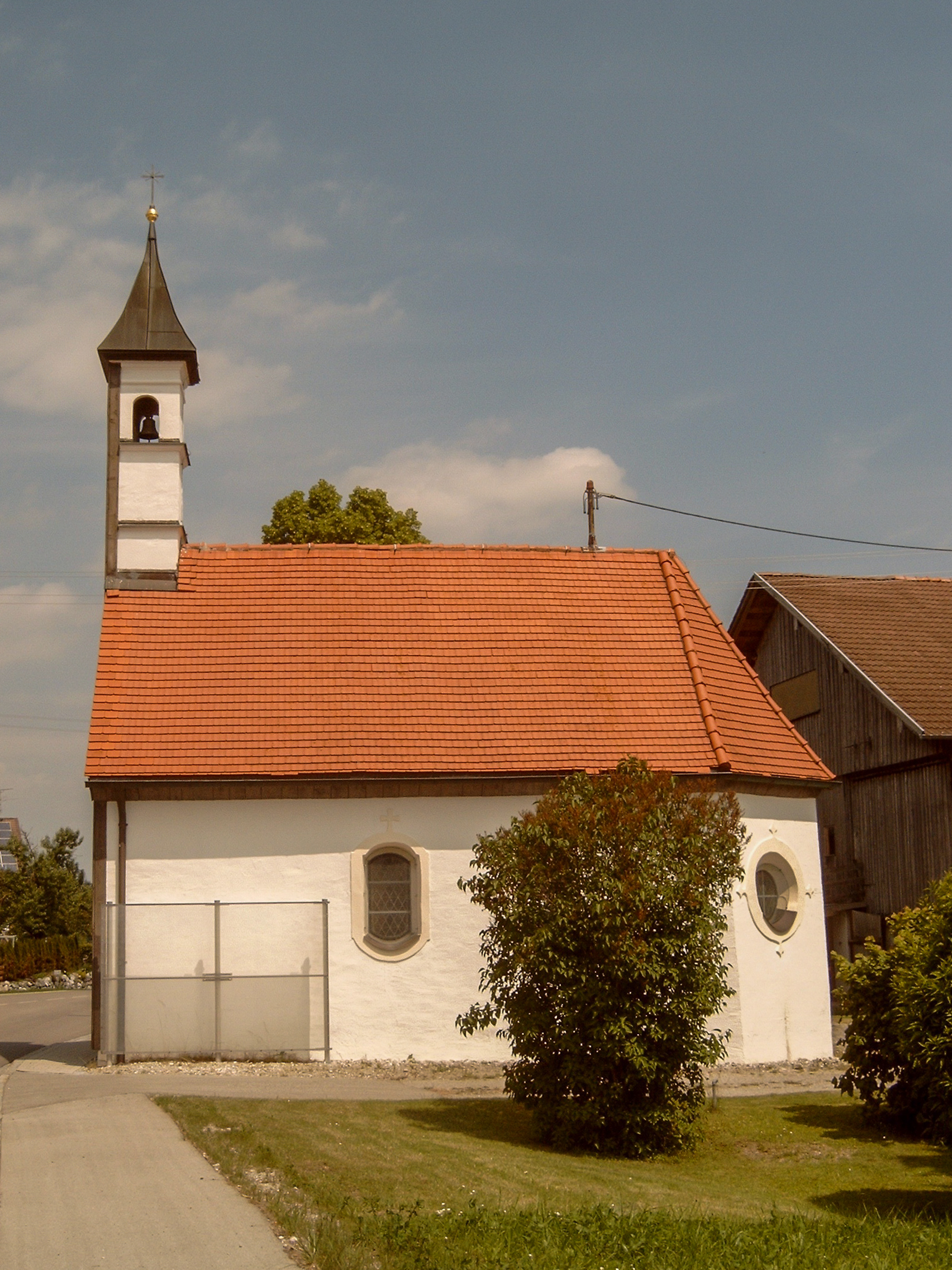
Balteratsried, chapel

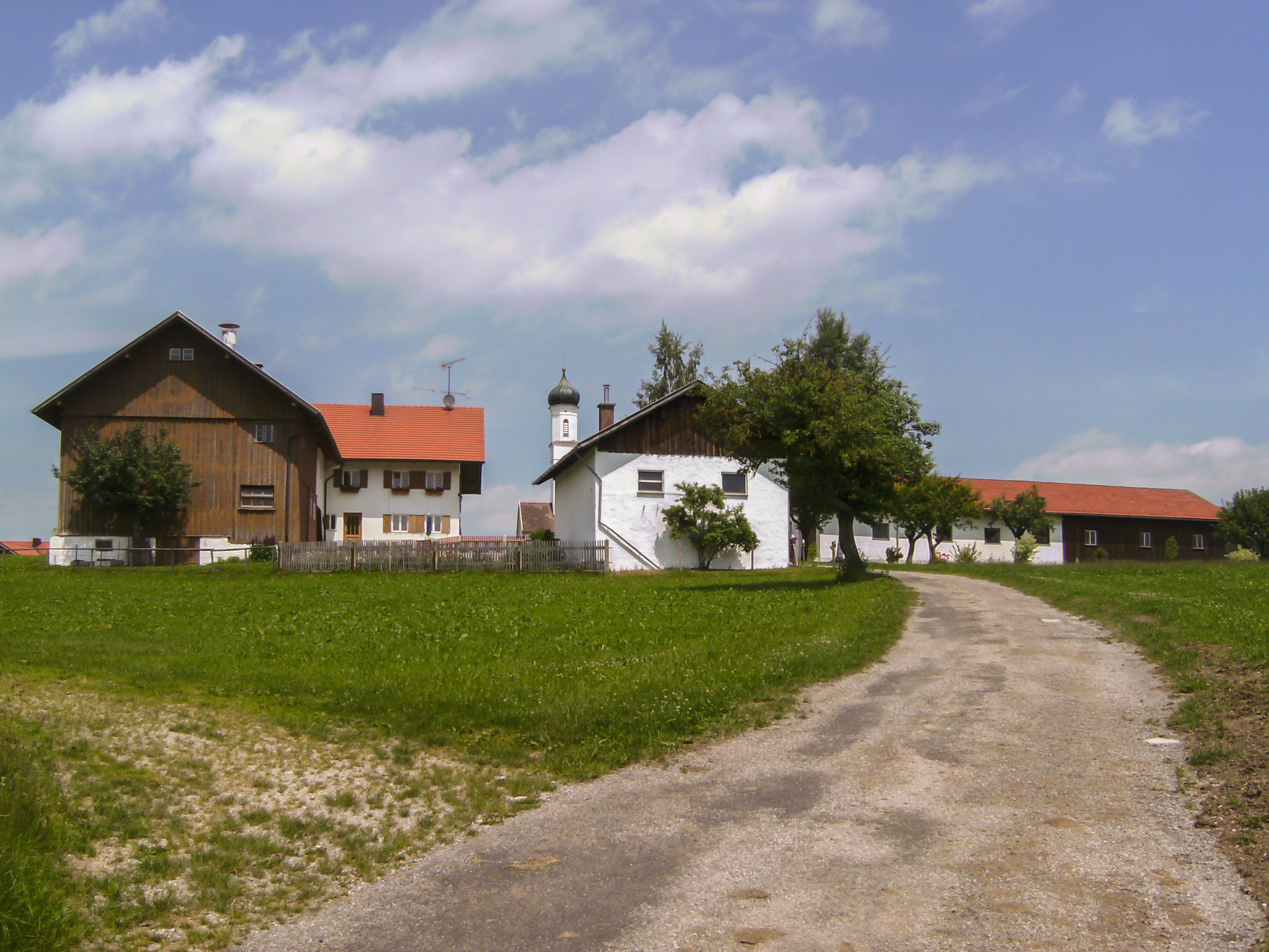
Kohlhunden, view to the village

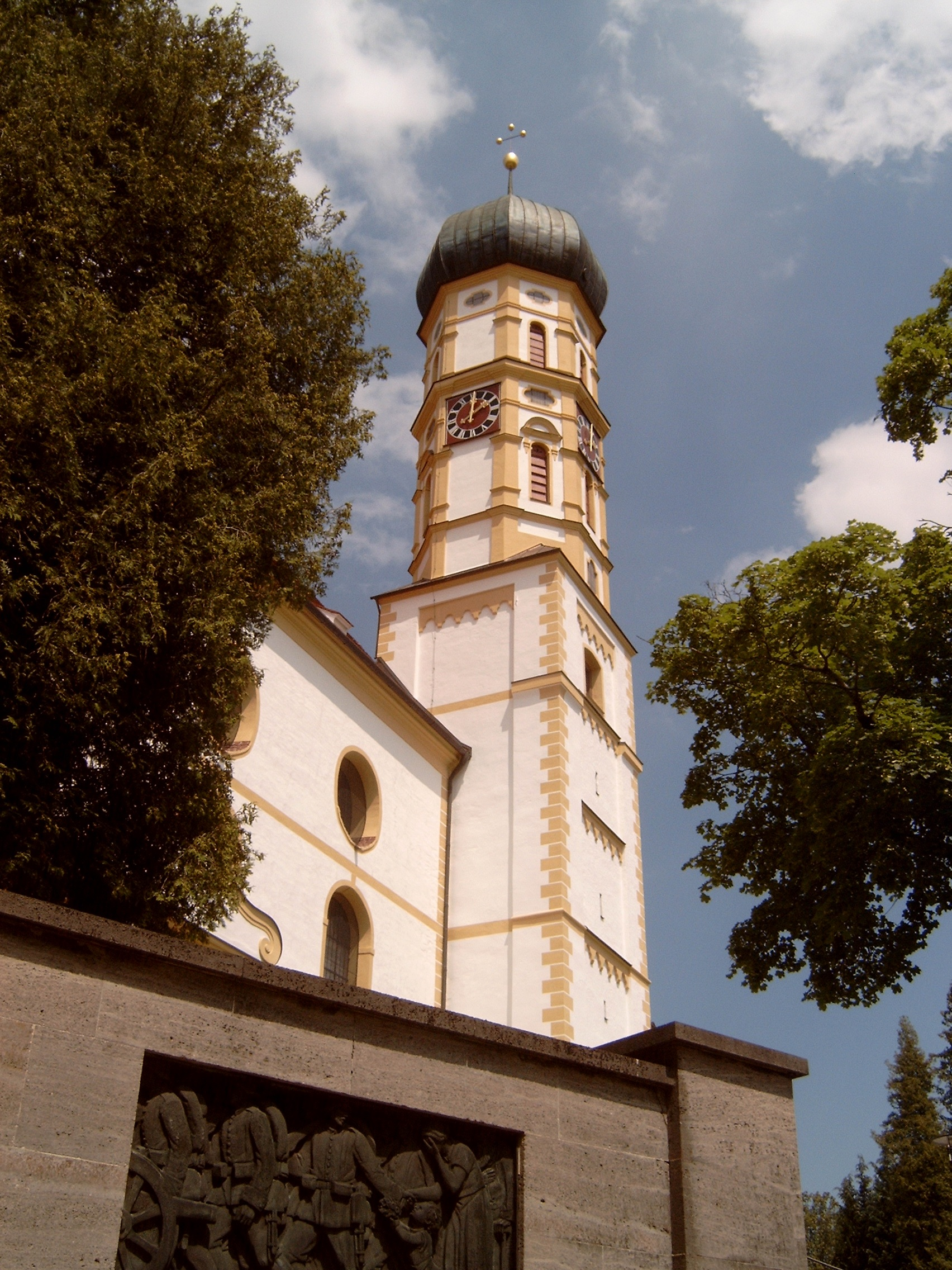
Marktoberdorf, church: Pfarrkirche Sankt Martin.

== See also ==
- Summer School Marktoberdorf, annual computer science summer school
