= List of model checking tools =

This article lists model checking tools and gives an overview of the functionality of each.

== Overview of some model checking tools ==
The following table includes model checkers that have

1. a web site from which it can be downloaded,
2. a declared license,
3. a description published in archived literature, and
4. a Wikipedia article describing it.

In the below table, the following abbreviations are used:

- Equivalences:
  - SB: Strong Bisimulation
  - WB: Weak Bisimulation
  - BB: Branching Bisimulation
  - STE: Strong Trace Equivalence
  - WTE: Weak Trace Equivalence
  - me: May Equivalence
  - ME: Must Equivalence
  - OE: Observational Equivalence
  - SE: Safety Equivalence
  - t*E: tau*.a Equivalence
- Software license:
  - FUSC: Free Under Specific Condition (e.g., free for academics)

Name	Model Checking			Equivalence checking		GUI			Availability		
	Plain, Probabilistic, Stochastic, ...	Modelling language	Properties language	Supported equivalences	Counter example generation	GUI	Graphical Specification	Counter example visualization	Software license	Programming language used	Platform, OS
BLAST	Code analysis	C	Monitor automata		Yes	No	No	No	Free	OCaml	Windows, Unix related
CADP	Plain and probabilistic	LOTOS, FC2, FSP, LNT	AFMC, MCL, XTL	SB, WB, BB, OE, STE, WTE, SE, tau*E	Yes	Yes	No	Yes	FUSC	C, Bourne shell, Tcl/Tk, LOTOS, LNT	macOS, Linux, Solaris, Windows
CPAchecker	Code analysis	C	Monitor automata		Yes	Yes	No	Yes	Free	Java	Any
DREAM	Real-time	C++, Timed automata	Monitor automata		Yes	No	No	No	Free	C++	Windows, Unix related
FizzBee Specification Language	Plain and probabilistic	Python	LTL		Yes	Yes	No	Yes	Free	Go	macOS, Windows, Linux
GreatSPN	Plain, probabilistic, real-time, stochastic	Time Petri Nets, Stochastic Petri Nets, Colored Petri Nets, Well-formed Petri Nets	LTL, CTL, CTL*, CSL, CSL^{TA}		No	Yes	Yes	No	Free	C, C++, Java	macOS, Windows, Linux
Java Pathfinder	Plain and timed	Java	unknown		No	Yes	No	No	Open Source Agreement	Java	macOS, Windows, Linux
Murφ (Murphi)	Plain	Murφ	Invariants, assertions		Yes	No	No	No	Free	C++	Linux
NuSMV	Plain	SMV input language	CTL, LTL, PSL		Yes	No	No	No	Free	C	Unix, Windows, macOS
PAT	Plain, real-time, probabilistic	CSP#, timed CSP, probabilistic CSP	LTL, assertions		Yes	Yes	Yes	Yes	Free	C#	Windows, others with Mono
PRISM	Probabilistic	PEPA, PRISM language, Plain MC	CSL, PLTL, PCTL		No	Yes	No	No	Free	C++, Java	Windows, Linux, macOS
Rumur	Plain	Murφ	Invariants, assertions		Yes	No	No	No	Free	C	macOS, Linux
SPIN	Plain	Promela	LTL		Yes	Yes	No	Yes	FUSC	C, C++	Windows, Unix related
TAPAAL	Real-time	Timed-Arc Petri Nets, age invariants, inhibitor arcs, transport arcs	TCTL subset		No	Yes	Yes	Yes	Free	C++, Java	macOS, Windows, Linux
TAPAs	Plain	CCSP	CTL, μ-calculus	SB, WB, BB, STE, WTE, me, ME, OE	Yes	Yes	Yes	Yes	Free	Java	Windows, macOS, Unix related
UPPAAL	Real-time	Timed automata, C subset	TCTL subset		Yes	Yes	Yes	Yes	FUSC	C++, Java	macOS, Windows, Linux
ROMEO	Real-time	Time Petri Nets, stopwatch parametric Petri nets	TCTL subset		Yes	Yes	Yes	No	Free	C++, Tcl/Tk	macOS, Windows, Linux
TLA+ Model Checker (TLC)	Plain	TLA+, PlusCal	TLA		Yes	Yes	Yes	No	Free	Java	macOS, Windows, Linux

== Modelling languages ==
- CCSP: A process calculus obtained from CCS by incorporating some operators of CSP. It is defined by Olderog and by van Glabbeek/Vaandrager.
- CSP: Communicating sequential processes; formal language for describing patterns of interaction in concurrent systems. FDR2 is a refinement checking tool for CSP, comparing two models for compatibility.
- DVE input language: a system is described as Network of Extended Finite State Machines communicating via shared variables and unbuffered channels. Does not contain support for buffered channels and for checking the type of message to be received without performing the receive proper.
- FC2: (Common Format V2) Machine-level ASCII representation for synchronized (hierarchical) networks of automata. Defined by the Esprit Basic Research Action CONCUR, 1992. Used as an input and exchange format by a number of verification tools, mainly in the area of process algebras.
- FSP: Finite State Processes language defined at Imperial College.
- Java: Object-oriented programming language.
- LNT: LOTOS New Technology; a specification language inspired by process calculi, functional programming languages, and imperative programming languages; LNT was designed as a modern replacement for LOTOS and E-LOTOS.
- LOTOS: Language Of Temporal Ordering Specification (ISO standard 8807); formal specification language based on temporal ordering used for protocol specification in ISO OSI standards.
- mCRL2: A specification language for describing concurrent discrete event systems.
- Murφ: Guarded commands and an asynchronous, interleaving model of concurrency, with all synchronization and communication done through global variables.
- PEPA: Performance Evaluation Process Algebra; it is a stochastic process algebra designed for modelling computer and communication systems.
- Plain MC: simple text-file formats used in MRMC and PRISM.
- Promela: Process or Protocol Meta Language; it is a verification modeling language. The language allows for the dynamic creation of concurrent processes to model, for example, distributed systems.
- Starlark: Starlark is a dialect of Python created by Google for Bazel. Model checkers like FizzBee uses Starlark/Python as the modeling language.
- TLA+: General-purpose specification language based on the Temporal Logic of Actions, originally used for distributed and concurrent systems. The language for the specifications and their properties is the same.

== Properties language ==
- AFMC: Alternation-Free modal μ-calculus.
- Assertions: Imperative assertion statements.
- CSL: Continuous Stochastic Logic, characterizes bisimulation of continuous-time Markov processes.
- CSRL: Continuous Stochastic Reward Logic; a logic to specify measures over CTMCs extended with a reward structure (so-called Markov reward models).
- CTL: Computation Tree Logic; a branching-time logic, meaning that its model of time is a tree-like structure in which the future is not determined; there are different paths in the future, any one of which might be an actual path that is realized.
- Invariants: Predicates over a system state.
- LTL: Linear temporal logic; a modal temporal logic with modalities referring to time.
- MCL: Model Checking Language; Alternation-Free Modal μ-calculus extended with user-friendly regular expressions and value-passing constructs; subsumes CTL and LTL.
- mCRL2 mu-calculus: Kozen's propositional modal μ-calculus (excluding atomic propositions), extended with: data-depended processes, quantification over data types, multi-actions, time, and regular formulas.
- PCTL: Probabilistic CTL; an extension of CTL which allows for probabilistic quantification of described properties.
- PLTL: Probabilistic Linear Temporal Logic.
- PRCTL: Probabilistic Reward Computation Tree Logic; it extends PCTL with reward-bounded properties.
- PSL: Property specification language
- SVA: SystemVerilog standards assertion language subset, standardized as IEEE 1800
- XTL: eXtended Temporal Language; a domain-specific language for quickly implementing action-based, explicit-state, value-passing model checkers.

== Comparison of model checking tools ==
=== Scientific publications ===
There exists a few papers that systematically compare various model checkers on a common case study. The comparison usually discusses the modelling tradeoffs faced when using the input languages of each model checker, as well as the comparison of performances of the tools when verifying correctness properties. One can mention:

- In 1999, Judi Romijn compared two model checkers (CADP and SPIN) on the HAVi interoperability audio-video protocol for consumer electronics.
- In 2003, Yifei Dong, Xiaoqun Du, Gerard J. Holzmann, and Scott A. Smolka published a comparison of four model checkers (namely: Cospan, Murphi, SPIN, and XMC) on a communication protocol, the GNU i-protocol.
- In 2005, Elena M. Bortnik, Nikola Trcka, Anton Wijs, Bas Luttik, J. M. van de Mortel-Fronczak, Jos C. M. Baeten, Wan Fokkink, and J. E. Rooda published a comparison of four model checkers (namely: CADP, muCRL, SPIN, and UPPAAL) on an industrial manufacturing system, a rotating drilling machine.
- In 2018, F. Mazzanti and A. Ferrari published a comparison of ten model checkers (namely: CADP, CPN Tools, FDR4, NuSMV/nuXmv, mCRL2, ProB, SPIN, TLA+, UMC, and UPPAAL) on a train supervision problem, taking into account both the user-friendliness of the languages and the performance of the tools.

=== International software competitions ===
- Since 2007, the Hardware Model Checking Competition (HWMCC) compares the performances of model checking tools oriented towards hardware design.
- Since 2011, the Model Checking Contest (MCC) compare performances of model checking tools designed to analyze highly concurrent systems.

== See also ==
- AltaRica
