= Mihaela Sighireanu =

French and Romanian computer scientist

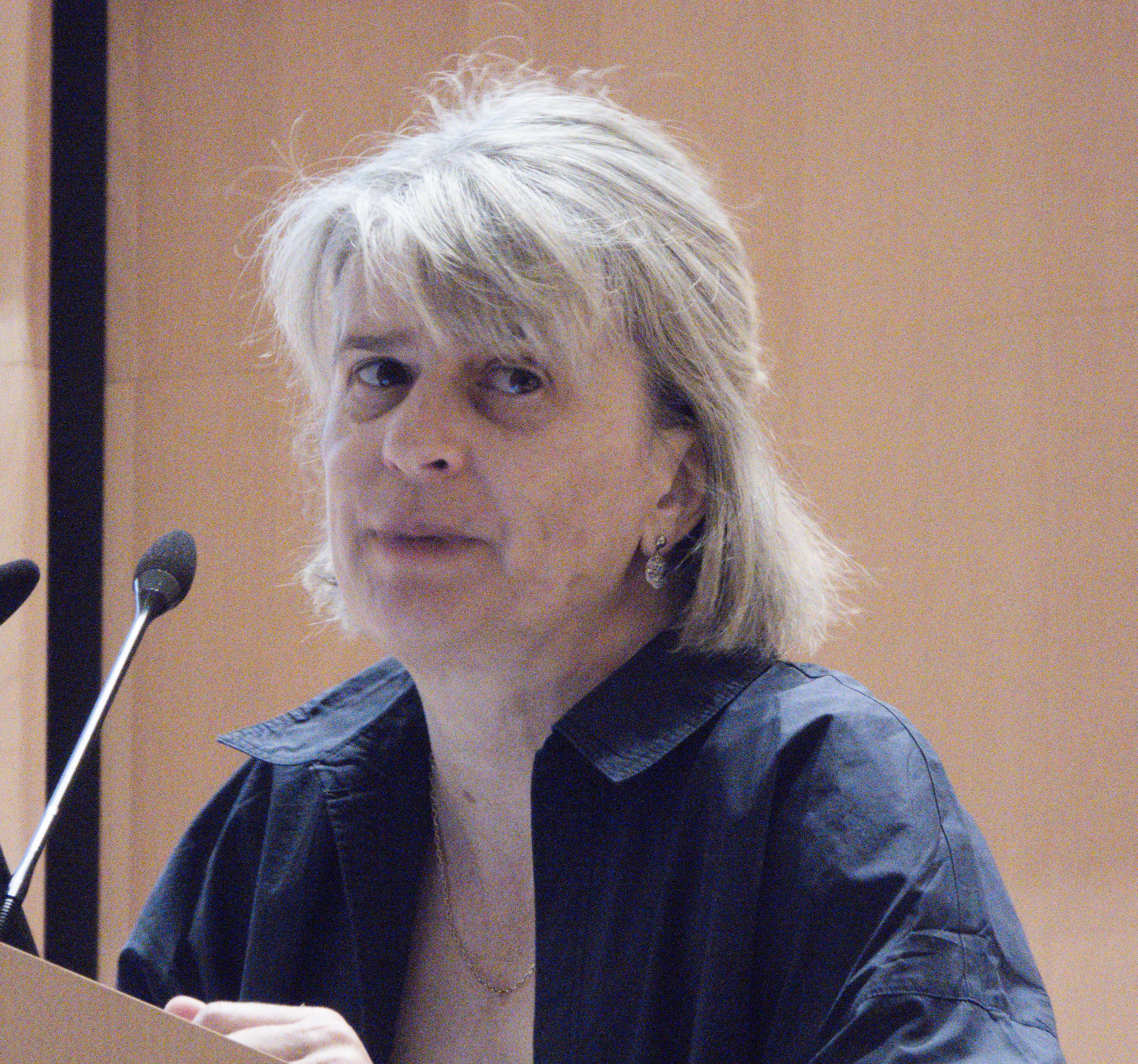

Mihaela Sighireanu is a French and Romanian computer scientist specializing in model checking and software verification. She works as a professor at Paris-Saclay University and as a member of the Formal Methods Lab run jointly by Paris-Saclay University, CNRS, and the École normale supérieure Paris-Saclay.

== Education and career ==
Sighireanu was born in Romania, and holds French and Romanian dual citizenship. She studied computer science at the University of Bucharest, earning a master's degree there in 1994, and then moved to Joseph Fourier University (now part of Grenoble Alpes University) for a second master's degree in 1995 and a doctorate in 1999. She earned a habilitation in 2014 through Paris Diderot University.

After postdoctoral research at the French Institute for Research in Computer Science and Automation, she became an assistant professor at Paris Diderot University in 1999 and an associate professor in 2014 at the University of Paris, before moving to her present position at Paris-Saclay University.

She has represented Romania as a delegate to ISO/IEC JTC 1, where she contributed to the development of the E-LOTOS standard for formal specifications.
