= SLAM project =

Microsoft research project

The SLAM project, which was started in 1999 by Thomas Ball and Sriram Rajamani of Microsoft Research, aimed at verifying software safety properties using model checking techniques. It was implemented in OCaml, and has been used to find many bugs in Windows Device Drivers. It is distributed as part of the Microsoft Windows Driver Foundation development kit as the Static Driver Verifier (SDV). "SLAM originally was an acronym but we found it too cumbersome to explain. We now prefer to think of 'slamming' the bugs in a program." It initially stood for "software (specifications), programming languages, abstraction, and model checking". Microsoft has since re-used the SLAM acronym to stand for "Social Location Annotation Mobile".

== See also ==
- Abstraction model checking
- the BLAST model checker, a model checker similar to SLAM that uses "lazy abstraction"
