= LNT =

LNT may refer to:

- Alliant Energy (stock symbol LNT)
- Leave No Trace camping
- Linear no-threshold model for ionizing radiation
- Latvijas Neatkarīgā Televīzija, TV station
- Lean NO_{x} trap, an NOx adsorber
- A computer language descended from E-LOTOS
- One of two treaties signed prior to the Second World War:
  - London Naval Treaty (1930)
  - Second London Naval Treaty (1936)
