= Zoi =

Zoi or ZOI may refer to:

- Fictional human life form in InZOI, a life simulation game
- Zero-one-infinity rule, rule of thumb in software design
- Zoi (city), or Hezuo, city in Gansu, China
- Zone of influence, see Earth potential rise
- Zoi Fitsiou (born 1995), Greek rower
- Zoi Sadowski-Synnott (born 2001), New Zealand snowboarder

== See also ==
- Zoe (name)
