= Hartmut Ehrig =

German computer scientist (1944 - 2016)

- Born: 6 December 1944; Angermünde
- Died: 17 March 2016 (aged 71)
- Education: TU Berlin
- Spouse: Gertraud
- Children: Karsten, Timo, Rita
- Scientific career
- Fields: Algebraic specification, Graph grammars
- Workplaces: TU Berlin
- Theses: Übertragung universeller und spezieller Probleme in F-Morphismendarstellung (1971); Automata Theory and Formal Language (1974)
- Doctoral advisor: Kurt Leichtweiß
- Doctoral students: Hans-Jörg Kreowski, Michael Löwe, Bernd Mahr

Hartmut Ehrig (born 6 December 1944 in Angermünde; died 17 March 2016) was a German computer scientist and professor of theoretical computer science and formal specification. He was a pioneer in algebraic specification of abstract data types, and in graph grammars.

== Vita ==
In 1969, Ehrig received his diploma in mathematics from Technische Universität Berlin. In 1971, he earned his doctorate, and in 1974 his habilitation from the same university. Subsequently, he had research stays at the Thomas J. Watson Research Center, among others. In 1976, he became a lecturer at the TU Berlin, and the director of its Institute for Software Engineering and Theoretical Computer Science. In 1984, he was appointed full professor at the TU Berlin. Between 1981 and 1991, he was also Dean of its Department of Computer Science for several periods. He was EATCS Vice President from 1997 to 2002. He retired on 1 October 2010.

== Selected publications ==
- Hartmut Ehrig (1971). Übertragung universeller und spezieller Probleme in F-Morphismendarstellung (Ph.D. thesis). Technische Universität Berlin.
- Hartmut Ehrig; Michael Pfender (1972). Kategorien und Automaten. Berlin: de Gruyter. doi:10.1515/9783110832020. ISBN 3-11-003902-8.
- Hartmut Ehrig; Michael Pfender; Hans-Jürgen Schneider (Oct 1973). "Graph-Grammars: An Algebraic Approach". IEEE Conference Record of 14th Annual Symposium on Switching and Automata Theory (SWAT'08). IEEE. pp. 167–180. doi:10.1109/SWAT.1973.11.
- Hartmut Ehrig; Klaus-Dieter Kiermeier; Hans-Jörg Kreowski; Wolfgang Kühnel (1974). Universal theory of automata — a categorial approach. Stuttgart: Teubner. ISBN 3-519-02054-8.
- Volker Claus; Hartmut Ehrig; Grzegorz Rozenberg, eds. (1979). "A pumping lemma for context-free graph languages". Graph-Grammars and Their Application to Computer Science and Biology. Lecture Notes in Computer Science. Vol. 73. Heidelberg: Springer. pp. 270–283. doi:10.1007/BFb0025726. ISBN 978-3-540-35091-0.
- Hartmut Ehrig; Bernd Mahr (1985). Fundamentals of Algebraic Specification 1 – Equations and Initial Semantics. Monographs in Theoretical Computer Science. Vol. 6 (1st ed.). Heidelberg: Springer. ISBN 978-3-642-69964-1.
- Hartmut Ehrig; Bernd Mahr (1990). Fundamentals of Algebraic Specification 2 – Module Specifications and Constraints. Monographs in Theoretical Computer Science. Vol. 21 (1st ed.). Heidelberg: Springer. ISBN 978-3-642-64776-5.
- Hartmut Ehrig; Klaus P. Jantke; Fernando Orejas; Horst Reichel, eds. (Apr 1990). Recent Trends in Data Type Specification, Proceedings 7th Workshop on Abstract Data Types. LNCS. Vol. 534. Springer.
- I. Claßen; H. Ehrig; D. Wolz (1993). Algebraic Specification Techniques and Tools for Software Development – The ACT Approach. AMAST Series in Computing. World Scientific Publishing.
- Hartmut Ehrig; G. Engels; H.-J. Kreowski; G. Rozenberg, eds. (Oct 1999). Applications, Languages and Tools. Handbook of Graph Grammars and Computing by Graph Transformation. Vol. 2. World Scientific. doi:10.1142/4180. ISBN 978-981-02-4020-2.
- Hartmut Ehrig; Julia Padberg; Gabriel Juhás; Grzegorz Rozenberg, eds. (2001). Unifying Petri Nets – Advances in Petri Nets. Lecture Notes in Computer Science. Vol. 2128. Heidelberg: Springer. doi:10.1007/3-540-45541-8. ISBN 978-3-540-43067-4. S2CID 11160106.
- Hartmut Ehrig; Wolfgang Reisig; Grzegorz Rozenberg; Herbert Weber (2004). Petri Net Technology for Communication-Based Systems. Lecture Notes in Computer Science. Vol. 2472. Heidelberg: Springer. ISBN 9783540205388.
- Hartmut Ehrig; Gregor Engels; Francesco Parisi-Presicce; Grzegorz Rozenberg, eds. (2004). Proceedings of the 2nd International Conference on Graph Transformation (ICGT). LNCS. Vol. 3256. Heidelberg: Springer. doi:10.1007/b100934. ISBN 978-3-540-23207-0. S2CID 32093939.
- Hartmut Ehrig; Karsten Ehrig; Ulrike Prange; Gabriele Taentzer (2006). Fundamentals of Algebraic Graph Transformation. EATCS Monographs in Theoretical Computer Science. Heidelberg: Springer. doi:10.1007/3-540-31188-2. ISBN 3-540-31187-4.
- Hartmut Ehrig; Claudia Ermel; Ulrike Golas; Frank Hermann (2015). Graph and Model Transformation. EATCS Monographs in Theoretical Computer Science. Heidelberg: Springer. doi:10.1007/978-3-662-47980-3. ISBN 978-3-662-47979-7. S2CID 27723564.
