= Widening =

Widening may refer to:

== Lexicology ==
- Semantic change § Types of semantic change

== Computer Science ==
- Widening (computer science), several techniques used in verification.
