= Hans-Jörg Kreowski =

German computer scientist (born 1949)

- Born: 10 August 1949 (age 77)
- Education: Technische Universität Berlin
- Alma mater: Technische Universität Berlin
- Scientific career
- Fields: Theoretical computer science
- Workplaces: University of Bremen
- Thesis: Manipulationen von Graphmanipulationen (1978)
- Doctoral advisor: Hartmut Ehrig

Hans-Jörg Kreowski (born 10 August 1949) is a professor for computer science at the University of Bremen in North West Germany. His primary research area is theoretical computer science with an emphasis on graph transformation, algebraic specification, and syntactic picture processing. He is also a member of the Forum of Computer Scientists for Peace and Social Responsibility (FIfF).

== Education and career ==
Hans-Jörg Kreowski studied mathematics from 1969 to 1974 at Technische Universität Berlin in Germany with a scholarship of Studienstiftung des deutschen Volkes. From 1974 to 1978 he was a research assistant at the computer science department of the Technische Universität Berlin where he wrote his doctoral thesis on manipulations of graph transformations and then held an assistant professorship. He obtained his habilitation in 1982 and was appointed professor of theoretical computer science at the University of Bremen in Germany in the same year. There, along with colleagues such as Frieder Nake, Wolfgang Coy, Klaus-Peter Löhr and Hermann Gehring, he significantly shaped the development of the computer science department.

In 1985 Kreowski was a guest researcher at the IBM T.J. Watson Research Center in Yorktown Heights (N.Y, USA). He founded the IFIP Working Group 1.3 (Foundations of Systems Specifications) in 1992 and was its first chairman until 1997. He is also a member of the European Association for Theoretical Computer Science (EATCS), the Gesellschaft für Informatik, and the Forum of Computer Scientists for Peace and Social Responsibility which he chaired from 2003 to 2009. In 1996 he was conferred the Outstanding Service Award by the International Federation of Information Processing and in 2001 he was awarded the IFIP Silver Core. Since 2013 Hans Jörg Kreowski is also a member of the Leibniz Scientific Society.

== Research ==
Kreowski has authored over 160 scientific publications with fundamental contributions to the theory and applications of graph transformation, syntactic picture generation, and algebraic specification. He co-edited over 15 books, among them two handbooks on graph transformation. The edited books span his main research areas and such diverse topics as computer science and society, logistics, and formal methods in software and systems modeling. For many years he was the editor for the Educational Matters Column within the Bulletin of the European Association for Theoretical Computer Science.

== Selected publications ==
- Kreowski, Hans-Jörg; Kuske, Sabine (2012). "Polynomial Graph Transformability". Theoretical Computer Science. 429: 193–201. doi:10.1016/j.tcs.2011.12.039..
- Kreowski, Hans-Jörg; Kuske, Sabine (2011). "Graph Multiset Transformation - A New Framework for Massively Parallel Computation Inspired by DNA Computing". Natural Computing. 10 (2): 961–986. doi:10.1007/s11047-010-9245-6. S2CID 13576985..
- Kreowski, Hans-Jörg; Kuske, Sabine; von Totth, Caroline (2011). "Modeling Production Networks with Discrete Processes by Means of Communities of Autonomous Units". Logistics Research. 3 (2–3): 159–175. doi:10.1007/s12159-011-0054-9. S2CID 17050132..
- Hölscher, Karsten; Kreowski, Hans-Jörg; Kuske, Sabine (2009). "Autonomous Units to Model Interacting Sequential and Parallel Processes". Fundamenta Informaticae. 92 (3): 233–257. doi:10.3233/FI-2009-0073..
- Kuske, Sabine; Gogolla, Martin; Kreowski, Hans-Jörg; Ziemann, Paul (2009). "Towards an integrated graph-based semantics for UML". Software and Systems Modeling. 8 (3): 403–422. doi:10.1007/s10270-008-0101-4. S2CID 8866591..
- Busatto, Giorgio; Kreowski, Hans-Jörg; Kuske, Sabine (2005). "Abstract Hierarchical Graph Transformation". Mathematical Structures in Computer Science. 15 (4): 773–819. doi:10.1017/s0960129505004846. S2CID 14709890..
- Drewes, Frank; Klempien-Hinrichs, Renate; Kreowski, Hans-Jörg (2003). "Table-driven and context-sensitive collage languages". Journal of Automata, Languages and Combinatorics. 8: 5–24..
- Drewes, Frank; Ewert, Sigrid; Klempien-Hinrichs, Renate; Kreowski, Hans-Jörg (2003). "Computing Raster Images from Grid Picture Grammars". Journal of Automata, Languages and Combinatorics. 8: 499–519..
- Kreowski, Hans-Jörg; Kuske, Sabine (1999). "Graph Transformation Units with Interleaving Semantics". Formal Aspects of Computing. 11 (6): 690–723. doi:10.1007/s001659970005. S2CID 818602..
- Habel, Annegret; Kreowski, Hans-Jörg; Taubenberger, Stefan (1993). "Collages and Patterns Generated by Hyperedge Replacement". Languages of Design. 1: 125–145..
