= Language primitive =

Microcode in programming language

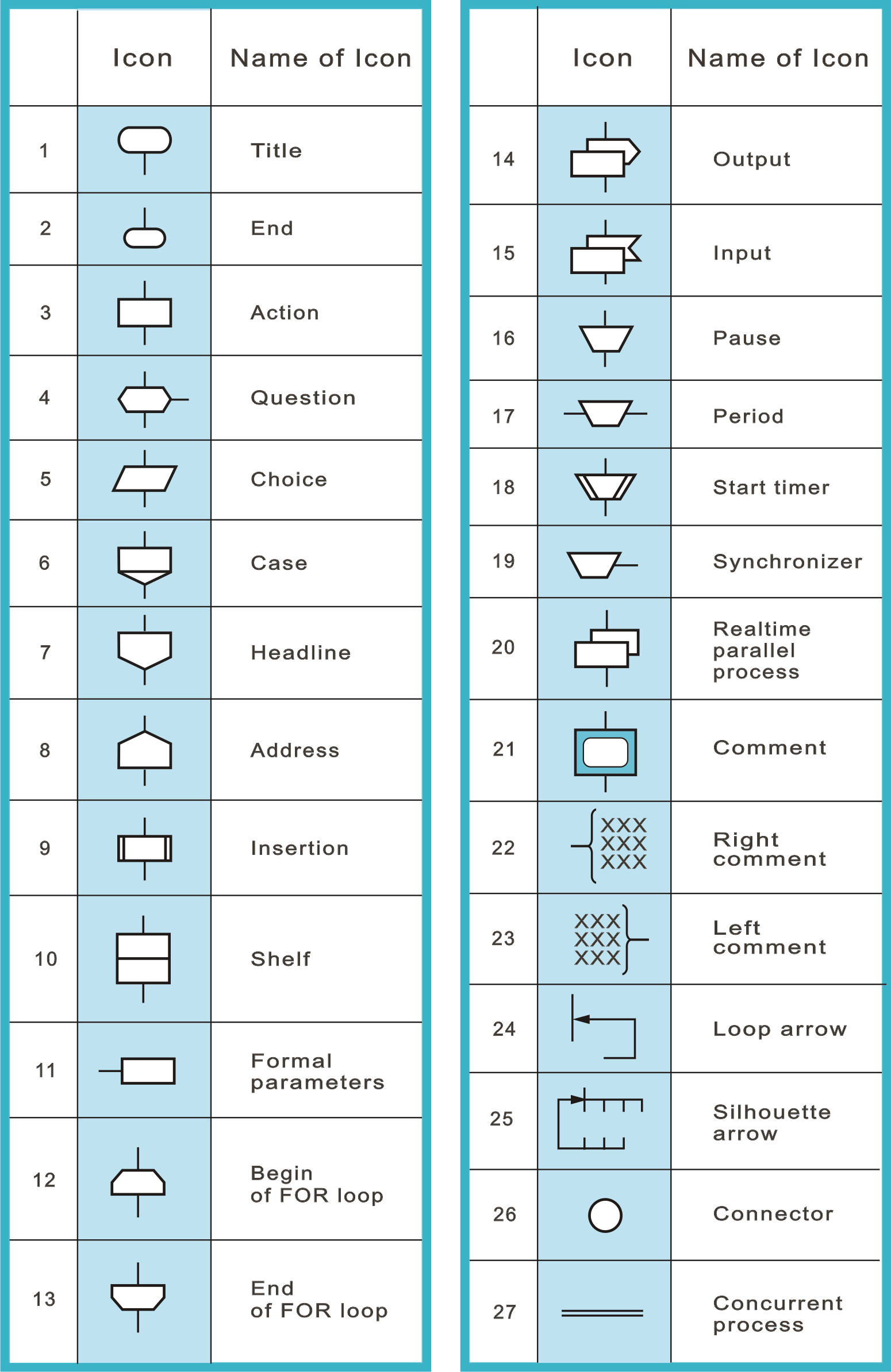
Primitives in the visual programming language DRAKON

In computing, language primitives are the simplest elements available in a programming language. A primitive is the smallest 'unit of processing' available to a programmer of a given machine, or can be an atomic element of an expression in a language.

Primitives are units with a meaning, i.e., a semantic value in the language. Thus they are different from tokens in a parser, which are the minimal elements of syntax.

== Types of primitives ==
=== Machine-level primitives ===
A machine instruction, usually generated by an assembler program, is often considered the smallest unit of processing although this is not always the case. It typically performs what is perceived to be one operation such as copying a byte or string of bytes from one computer memory location to another or adding one processor register to another.

=== Microcode primitives ===
Many of today's computers, however, actually embody an even lower unit of processing known as microcode which interprets the machine code and it is then that the microcode instructions would be the genuine primitives. These instructions would typically be available for modification only by the hardware vendor's programmers.

=== High-level language primitives ===
A high-level programming language (HLL) program is composed of discrete statements and primitive data types that may also be perceived to perform a single operation or represent a single data item, but at a higher semantic level than those provided by the machine. Copying a data item from one location to another may actually involve many machine instructions that, for instance,

- calculate the address of both operands in memory, based on their positions within a data structure,
- convert from one data type to another

before finally

- performing the final store operation to the target destination.

Some HLL statements, particularly those involving loops, can generate thousands or even millions of primitives in a low-level programming language (LLL), which comprise the genuine instruction path length the processor has to execute at the lowest level. This perception has been referred to as the abstraction penalty.

=== Interpreted language primitives ===
An interpreted language statement has similarities to the HLL primitives, but with a further added layer. Before the statement can be executed in a manner very similar to an HLL statement: it must first be processed by an interpreter, a process that may involve many primitives in the target machine language.

=== Fourth and fifth-generation language primitives ===
Fourth-generation programming languages (4GL) and fifth-generation programming languages (5GL) do not have a simple one-to-many correspondence from high-to-low level primitives. There are some elements of interpreted language primitives embodied in 4GL and 5GL specifications, but the approach to the original problem is less a procedural language construct and are more oriented toward problem solving and systems engineering.

== See also ==
- Primitive data type – An extremely basic/core data type provided by a programming language
- Hardware-software codesign
