= JPF =

JPF may refer to one of the following

- Judean pillar figure
- Journeyman Pipefitter
- Japonica Polonica Fantastica
- Java Pathfinder, a system to verify executable Java bytecode programs
- Jeunesse Populaire Française, a French youth fascist organization of 1940s
- JPEG 2000, a digital image format (file extension .jpf)
