= Gerrit van der Mey =

Deafblind Dutch mathematician

Gerrit van der Mey (5 January 1914 – November 2002) was a deafblind Dutch mathematician. He helped create software for PTERA and ZEBRA, some of the first computers designed in the Netherlands, as well as creating compilers for later computers. In 1982 he was made a member of the Order of Orange-Nassau at the grade of knight.

== Early life and education ==
Gerrit van der Mey was born 5 January 1914 in Lisse. He was the son of a well-known bulb grower. When he was four, he contracted meningitis and became completely blind due to an opening between his outer and middle ear. He attended elementary school at a school for the blind in Bussum. He attended high school at Blinden Studien Anstalt in Marburg, Germany, where his mathematics teacher recognized his impressive aptitude for the subject.

After returning to the Netherlands Mey began studying mathematics at Leiden University, but was forced to discontinue his studies when the Nazis shut down the university in 1941. He continued studying at Vrije Universiteit Amsterdam under Jurjen Ferdinand Koksma and Johannes Haantjes, where he graduated cum laude in 1943.

In 1945 Mey contracted meningitis again, leading to a total loss of hearing and loss of balance. He had to relearn to walk with the help of a guide dog. He continued his studies in mathematics at Leiden University working under Willem van der Woude; Mey received his Ph.D. in 1947. His dissertation was titled De resultant in de theorie der algebraische krommen, focusing on the theory of algebraic curves.

== Work at PTT ==
In 1951 Mey began working as a calculator (computer programmer) at the Mathematical Department of the PTT (Staatsbedrijf der Posterijen, Telegrafie en Telefonie; the Dutch mail and telephone company), working closely with Willem van der Poel. Computer programming was in its infancy at the time; the advantage for a blind worker was that there was no literature to consult as everything needed to be built from scratch. Large parts of the code and operating systems for some of the first electronic computers designed in the Netherlands, including PTERA (Postal Telecommunications Electronic Automatic Calculator) and ZEBRA (Very Simple Binary Automatic Calculator), were written by Mey. The first programs had to be written to use floating-point arithmetic, with conversions from decimal to binary. The Mathematical Department used his programming for applications such as cable calculations, filters for multiple carrier connections, and celestial mechanics. Mey also created the design of an ALGOL compiler and a LISP system for ZEBRA. For later systems he made IPL V, LISP, SNOBOL3 and ALGOL 68 compilers.

== Communication ==
A typewriter-style keyboard allowed people to type messages to him which would be converted to a specially-constructed braille reading-box. Even after thirty years of total deafness, he retained near perfect speech, allowing him to answer questions with his voice; he collaborated with researchers to investigate his ability to retain speech. A braille telephone and a braille telex were also created by his coworkers for his use. He used the Lorm alphabet to communicate with his wife and close friends.

== Personal life and travels ==
In 1957 Mey, his wife Suzanne Melgerd, and coworker Willem van der Poel attended a conference hosted by the Helen Keller Foundation to share information about his communication devices. They toured the United States and Canada with a group of deafblind people; a highlight of the trip was a visit to the Oval Office to meet President Eisenhower. On the boat trip from Europe, Mey's lack of balance made it impossible for him to walk unassisted, but as a consolation he did not suffer from seasickness.

Mey traveled extensively and memorized the Dutch railway network schedules. Before becoming deaf, he was an excellent pianist and played occasionally even after losing his hearing. He and his wife had three daughters together.

== Later life ==
When his colleague Willem van der Poel became a professor at the Delft University of Technology, Mey went to work with him. He retired in 1978. In 1982 he was designated as a Knight in the Order of Oranje Nassau. His wife unexpectedly died in 1983; he would later remarry and divorce.

Mey spent his final years at the center for the deaf-blind at Beek. He died in November 2002.
