= Common Algebraic Specification Language =

The Common Algebraic Specification Language (CASL) is a general-purpose specification language based on first-order logic with induction. Partial functions and subsorting are also supported.

== Overview ==
Designed by the Common Framework Initiative (CoFI), with the aim to subsume existing specification languages, and is implemented in four orthogonal levels:

basic specifications
for the specification of single software modules,
structured specifications
for the modular specification of modules,
architectural specifications
for the prescription of the structure of implementations,
specification libraries
for storing specifications distributed over the Internet.

The structural, architectural, and algebraic specification infrastructure can be extended beyond CASL. For this purpose, it has been formalized as a logical institution.

== Extensions ==
Several extensions of CASL have been designed:

- HasCASL, a higher-order extension
- CoCASL, a coalgebraic extension
- CspCASL, a concurrent extension based on CSP
- ModalCASL, a modal logic extension
- CASL-LTL, a temporal logic extension
- HetCASL, an extension for heterogeneous specification
