= PAT (model checker) =

Finite-state model checker for concurrent and real-time systems

- Developer: National University of Singapore
- Initial release: 2008
- Stable release: 3.5.1 / August 13, 2013; 12 years ago
- Written in: C#
- Operating system: Microsoft Windows; Linux, Unix, Mac OS X with Mono
- Platform: .Net 3.0
- Available in: English; Chinese(Simplified); Chinese(Traditional); Japanese; German; Vietnamese
- Type: Model checking
- Website: http://pat.comp.nus.edu.sg/

PAT (Process Analysis Toolkit) is a self-contained framework for composing, simulating and reasoning of concurrent, real-time systems and other possible domains. It includes user interfaces, model editor and animated simulator. PAT implements various model checking techniques catering for different properties such as freedom from deadlock and divergence, reachability, LTL properties with fairness assumptions, refinement checking and probabilistic model checking. To achieve good performance, advanced optimization techniques are implemented in PAT, e.g. partial order reduction, symmetry reduction, process counter abstraction.
