= Abstract model checking =

In computer science and in mathematics, abstraction model checking is a form of model checking for systems where an actual representation is too complex in developing the model alone. So, the design undergoes a kind of translation to scaled down "abstract" version.

The set of variables are partitioned into visible and invisible depending on their change of values. The real state space is summarized into a smaller set of the visible ones.

== Galois connected ==
The real and the abstract state spaces are Galois connected. This means that if we take an element from the abstract space, concretize it and abstract the concretized version, the result will be equal to the original. On the other hand, if you pick an element from the real space, abstract it and concretize the abstract version, the final result will be a super set of the original.

That is,

$\eta$($\theta$(abstract)) = abstract
$\theta$($\eta$(real)) $\supseteq$ real

== See also ==
- Abstract interpretation
- Automated theorem proving
- Computation tree logic
- Formal verification
- List of model checking tools
- Program analysis (computer science)
- Static code analysis
