= PRISM model checker =

PRISM is a probabilistic model checker, a formal verification software tool for the modelling and analysis of systems that exhibit probabilistic behaviour. PRISM was introduced around 2002 in the context of Parker's PhD work and is still under active development (as of 2024).

One source of such systems is the use of randomization, for example in communication protocols like Bluetooth and FireWire, or in security protocols such as Crowds and Onion routing. Stochastic behaviour also arises in many other computer systems, for example due to equipment failures, unreliable sensors and actuators, or unpredictable communication delays. PRISM has been used to analyse a diverse range of applications, from robot planning to computer network performance analysis to biochemical reaction networks.

PRISM can be used to analyse several different types of probabilistic models, including discrete-time Markov chains, continuous-time Markov chains, Markov decision processes and probabilistic extensions of the timed automata formalism. It also supports probabilistic models with partial observability and notions of epistemic uncertainty. Properties to be verified against these models are expressed in probabilistic extensions of temporal logic, such as PCTL. PRISM's companion tool PRISM-games provides analysis for stochastic games.

Development of PRISM is led from the University of Oxford. The project originally began at the University of Birmingham. The tool is open-source software, released under the GNU General Public License. PRISM has been selected for the Google Summer of Code programme in 2013 and 2014. The tool and its creators have won several awards: the 2024 ETAPS Test-of-Time Tool Award and the HVC 2016 Award.

The PRISM probabilistic model checker appears unrelated to the PRISM probabilistic logic programming system (PRogramming In Statistical Modelling, introduced in the late 1990s by Sato and collaborators).
