= Jan Friso Groote =

Dutch computer scientist

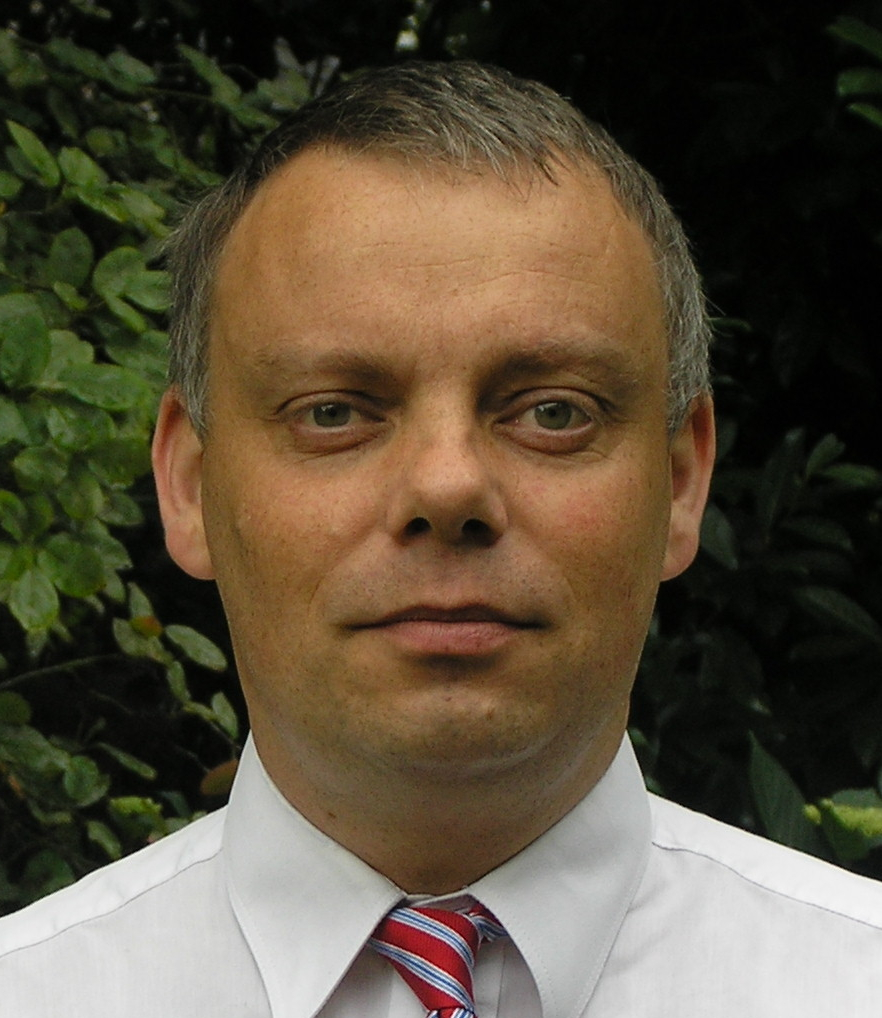
Jan Friso Groote (2009)

Jan Friso Groote (born April 13, 1965, in Doetinchem) is a Dutch computer scientist.

== Education ==
Groote studied computer science at Twente University obtaining his master's degree in 1988 under supervision of Ed Brinksma. He obtained his PhD thesis in 1991 under Jan Bergstra and Jos Baeten at the University of Amsterdam, while working at the Centre for Mathematics and Computer Science in Amsterdam.

== Profession ==
He contributed to structural operational semantics and verification technology. His particular contributions include the tyft/tyxt format for operational rules, the first algorithm to determine branching bisimulation and the cones and foci method to prove correctness of protocols and distributed algorithms. He is the founding godfather of the process modelling language and analysis tool sets μCRL and mCRL2.

He began working in 2000 as a full professor in verification technology at Eindhoven University of Technology.

== Works ==
- 2014. J.F. Groote and M.R. Mousavi. Modeling and Analysis of Communicating Systems. The MIT Press. ISBN 978-0262027717.
