= Libdmc =

libdmc
- Developer(s): Alexandre Hamez
- Operating system: Posix Systems
- Type: Model checking

Libdmc is a library designed at the LIP6 laboratory. Its goal is to ease the distribution of existing model checkers. It has also been designed to provide the most generic interfaces, without sacrificing performance, thanks to the C++ language.

Model checking offers a way to automatically prove that a modeled system behavior is correct by verifying properties. However, it suffers from the so-called state space explosion problem, caused by an intensive use of memory. Many solutions have been proposed to overcome this problem (e.g. symbolic representations with decisions diagrams - like BDD) but these methods can rapidly lead to an unacceptable time consumption.

Distributed model checking is a way to overcome both memory and time consumptions by using aggregated resources of a dedicated cluster. However, re-writing an entire model checker is a difficult task, so the approach of libdmc is to give a framework in order to construct a model checker.
