= Romeo Model Checker =

ROMEO
- Developer(s): LS2N
- Initial release: 2001
- Stable release: 3.9.1 / June 3, 2023; 21 months ago
- Written in: C++ and GUI in tcl/tk
- Operating system: Linux; Mac OS X Microsoft Windows
- Available in: English
- Type: Model checking
- Website: https://romeo.ls2n.fr/

Roméo is an integrated tool environment for modeling, validation and verification of real-time systems modeled as time Petri Nets or stopwatch Petri Nets, extended with parameters.

The tool has been developed by the Real-Time Systems group at LS2N lab (École centrale de Nantes, University of Nantes, CNRS) in Nantes, France.
