= Language of Temporal Ordering Specification =

Formal specification language in computer science

In computer science Language of Temporal Ordering Specification (LOTOS) is a formal specification language based on temporal ordering of events. LOTOS is used for communications protocol specification in International Organization for Standardization (ISO) Open Systems Interconnection model (OSI) standards.

LOTOS is an algebraic language that consists of two parts: a part for the description of data and operations, based on abstract data types, and a part for the description of concurrent processes, based on process calculus.

Work on the standard was completed in 1988, and it was published as ISO 8807 in 1989. Between 1993 and 2001, an ISO committee worked to define a revised version of the LOTOS standard, which was published in 2001 as E-LOTOS.

== See also ==
- Formal methods
- List of ISO standards
- CADP
- E-LOTOS
- Process calculus
