= E-LOTOS =

Formal specification language

In computer science E-LOTOS (Enhanced LOTOS) is a formal specification language designed between 1993 and 1999, and standardized by International Organization for Standardization (ISO) in 2001.

E-LOTOS was initially intended to be a revision of the LOTOS language standardized by ISO 8807 in 1989, but the revision turned out to be profound, leading to a new specification language.

The starting point for the revision of LOTOS was the PhD thesis of Ed Brinksma, who had been the Rapporteur at ISO of the LOTOS standard.

In 1993, the initial goals of the definition of E-LOTOS were stated in ISO/IEC JTC1/N2802 announcement.

In 1997, when the language definition reached the maturity level of an ISO Committee Draft, an announcement was posted describing the main features of E-LOTOS.

The following document recalls the milestones of E-LOTOS definition project.

E-LOTOS has inspired descendent languages, among which LOTOS NT and LNT.

== See also ==
- Formal methods
- List of ISO standards
- Language Of Temporal Ordering Specification
- CADP
