= Partial order reduction =

Technique used in formal verification of computer systems

In computer science, partial order reduction is a technique for reducing the size of the state-space to be searched by a model checking or automated planning and scheduling algorithm. It exploits the commutativity of concurrently executed transitions that result in the same state when executed in different orders.

In explicit state space exploration, partial order reduction usually refers to the specific technique of expanding a representative subset of all enabled transitions. This technique has also been described as model checking with representatives. There are various versions of the method, the so-called stubborn set method, ample set method, and persistent set method.

== Ample sets ==
Ample sets are an example of model checking with representatives. Their formulation relies on a separate notion of dependency. Two transitions are considered independent only if they cannot disable another whenever they are mutually enabled. The execution of both results in a unique state regardless of the order in which they are executed. Transitions that are not independent, are dependent. In practice dependency is approximated using static analysis.

Ample sets for different purposes can be defined by giving conditions as to when a set of transitions is "ample" in a given state.

C0 ${ample(s)=\varnothing} \iff {enabled(s)=\varnothing}$

C1 If a transition $\alpha$ depends on some transition relation in $ample(s)$, this transition cannot be invoked until some transition in the ample set is executed.

Conditions C0 and C1 are sufficient for preserving all the deadlocks in the state space. Further restrictions are needed in order to preserve more nuanced properties. For instance, in order to preserve properties of linear temporal logic, the following two conditions are needed:

C2 If $enabled(s) \neq ample(s)$, each transition in the ample set is invisible.

C3 A cycle is not allowed if it contains a state in which some transition $\alpha$ is enabled, but is never included in ample(s) for any states s on the cycle.

These conditions are sufficient for an ample set, but not necessary conditions.

== Stubborn sets ==
Stubborn sets make no use of an explicit independence relation. Instead they are defined solely through commutativity over sequences of actions. A set $T(s)$ is (weakly) stubborn at s, if the following hold.

D0 $\forall a \in T(s) \forall b_1,...,b_n \notin T(s)$, if execution of the sequence $b_1,...,b_n,a$ is possible and leads to the state $s'$, then execution of the sequence $a, b_1,...,b_n$ is possible and will lead to state $s'$.

D1 Either $s$ is a deadlock, or $\exists a \in T(s)$ such that $\forall b_1,...,b_n \notin T(s)$, the execution of $b_1,...,b_n,a$ is possible.

These conditions are sufficient for preserving all deadlocks, just like C0 and C1 are in the ample set method. They are, however, somewhat weaker, and as such may lead to smaller sets. The conditions C2 and C3 can also be further weakened from what they are in the ample set method, but the stubborn set method is compatible with C2 and C3.

== Others ==
There are also other notations for partial order reduction. One of the commonly used is the persistent set / sleep set algorithm. Detailed information can be found in Patrice Godefroid's thesis.

In symbolic model checking, partial order reduction can be achieved by adding more constraints (guard strengthening). Further applications of partial order reduction involve automated planning.
