= Shmuel Safra =

Israeli computer scientist

- שמואל ספרא
- Born: 1960 (age 65–66); Jerusalem
- Education: Ph.D. Weizmann Institute of Science
- Awards: Gödel Prize
- Scientific career
- Fields: Computer science, complexity theory
- Workplaces: Tel Aviv University
- Thesis: Complexity Of Automata On Infinite Objects (1990)
- Doctoral advisor: Amir Pnueli

Shmuel (Muli) Safra (Hebrew: שמואל ספרא) is an Israeli computer scientist. He is a professor of computer science at Tel Aviv University, Israel. He was born in Jerusalem.

Safra's research areas include complexity theory and automata theory. His work in complexity theory includes the classification of approximation problems—showing them NP-hard even for weak factors of approximation—and the theory of probabilistically checkable proofs (PCP) and the PCP theorem, which gives stronger characterizations of the class NP, via a membership proof that can be verified reading only a constant number of its bits.

His work on automata theory investigates determinization and complementation of finite automata over infinite strings, in particular, the complexity of such translation for Büchi automata, Streett automata and Rabin automata.

In 2001, Safra won the Gödel Prize in theoretical computer science for his papers "Interactive Proofs and the Hardness of Approximating Cliques" and "Probabilistic Checking of Proofs: A New Characterization of NP".

== See also ==
- Bull graph
- Set cover problem
- Vertex cover problem
