= Weak Büchi automaton =

In computer science and automata theory, a Weak Büchi automaton is a formalism which represents a set of infinite words. A Weak Büchi automaton is a modification of Büchi automaton such that for all pair of states $q$ and $q'$ belonging to the same strongly connected component, $q$ is accepting if and only if $q'$ is accepting.

A Büchi automaton accepts a word $w$ if there exists a run, such that at least one state occurring infinitely often in the final state set $F$. For Weak Büchi automata, this condition is equivalent to the existence of a run which ultimately stays in the set of accepting states.

Weak Büchi automata are strictly less-expressive than Büchi automata and than Co-Büchi automata.

== Properties ==
The deterministic Weak Büchi automata can be minimized in time $O(n \log(n))$.

The languages accepted by Weak Büchi automata are closed under union and intersection but not under complementation. For example, $(a+b)^*b^\omega$ can be recognised by a Weak Büchi automaton but its complement $(b^*a)^\omega$ cannot.

Non-deterministic Weak Büchi automata are more expressive than Weak Büchi automata. As an example, the language $(a+b)^*b^\omega$ can be decided by a Weak Büchi automaton but by no deterministic Büchi automaton.
