= Semi-deterministic Büchi automaton =

In automata theory, a semi-deterministic Büchi automaton (also known as Büchi automaton deterministic in the limit, or limit-deterministic Büchi automaton) is a special type of Büchi automaton. In such an automaton, the set of states can be partitioned into two subsets: one subset forms a deterministic automaton and also contains all the accepting states.

For every Büchi automaton, a semi-deterministic Büchi automaton can be constructed such that both recognize the same ω-language. But, a deterministic Büchi automaton may not exist for the same ω-language.

== Motivation ==
In standard model checking against linear temporal logic (LTL) properties, it is sufficient to translate an LTL formula into a non-deterministic Büchi automaton. But, in probabilistic model checking, LTL formulae are typically translated into deterministic Rabin automata (DRA), as for instance in the PRISM tool. However, a fully deterministic automaton is not needed. Indeed, semi-deterministic Büchi automata are sufficient in probabilistic model checking.

== Formal definition ==
A Büchi automaton (Q,Σ,∆,Q_{0},F) is called semi-deterministic if Q is the union of two disjoint subsets N and D such that F ⊆ D and, for every d ∈ D, the automaton (D,Σ,∆,{d},F) is deterministic.

== Transformation from a Büchi automaton ==
Any given Büchi automaton can be transformed into a semi-deterministic Büchi automaton that recognizes the same language, using following construction.

Suppose A=(Q,Σ,∆,Q_{0},F) is a Büchi automaton. Let Pr be a projection function which takes a set of states S and a symbol a ∈ Σ and returns set of states {q' | ∃q ∈ S and (q,a,q') ∈ ∆ }. The equivalent semi-deterministic Büchi automaton is A'=(N ∪ D,Σ,∆',Q'_{0},F'), where

- N = 2^{Q} and D = 2^{Q}×2^{Q}
- Q'_{0} = {Q_{0}}
- ∆' = ∆_{1} ∪ ∆_{2} ∪ ∆_{3} ∪ ∆_{4}
  - ∆_{1} = {( S, a, S' ) | S'=Pr(S,a) }
  - ∆_{2} = {( S, a, ({q'},∅) ) | ∃q ∈ S and (q,a,q') ∈ ∆ }
  - ∆_{3} = {( (L,R), a, (L',R') ) | L≠R and L'=Pr(L,a) and R'=(L'∩F)∪Pr(R,a) }
  - ∆_{4} = {( (L,L), a, (L',R') ) | L'=Pr(L,a) and R'=(L'∩F) }
- F' = {(L,L) | L≠∅ }

Note the structure of states and transitions of A′. States of A′ are partitioned into N and D. An N-state is defined as an element of the power set of states of A. A D-state is defined as a pair of elements of power set of states of A. The transition relation of A' is the union of four parts: ∆_{1}, ∆_{2}, ∆_{3}, and ∆_{4}. The ∆_{1}-transitions only take A' from a N-state to a N-state. Only the ∆_{2}-transitions can take A' from an N-state to a D-state. Note that only the ∆_{2}-transitions can cause non-determinism in A' . The ∆_{3} and ∆_{4}-transitions take A' from a D-state to a D-state. By construction, A' is a semi-deterministic Büchi automaton. The proof of L(A')=L(A) follows.

For an ω-word w=a_{1},a_{2},... , let w(i,j) be the finite segment a_{i+1},...,a_{j-1},a_{j} of w.

=== L(A') ⊆ L(A) ===
Proof: Let w ∈ L(A'). The initial state of A' is an N-state and all the accepting states in F' are D-states. Therefore, any accepting run of A' must follow ∆_{1} for finitely many transitions at start, then take a transition in ∆_{2} to move into D-states, and then take ∆_{3} and ∆_{4} transitions for ever. Let ρ' = S_{0},...,S_{n-1},(L_{0},R_{0}),(L_{1},R_{1}),... be such accepting run of A' on w.

By definition of ∆_{2}, L_{0} must be a singleton set. Let L_{0} = {s}. Due to definitions of ∆_{1} and ∆_{2}, there exist a run prefix s_{0},...,s_{n-1},s of A on word w(0,n) such that s_{j} ∈ S_{j}. Since ρ' is an accepting run of A' , some states in F' are visited infinitely often. Therefore, there exist a strictly increasing and infinite sequence of indexes i_{0},i_{1},... such that i_{0}=0 and, for each j > 0, L_{i_{j}}=R_{i_{j}} and L_{i_{j}}≠∅. For all j > 0, let m = i_{j}-i_{j-1}. Due to definitions of ∆_{3} and ∆_{4}, for every q_{m} ∈ L_{i_{j}}, there exist a state q_{0} ∈ L_{i_{j-1}} and a run segment q_{0},...,q_{m} of A on the word segment w(n+i_{j-1},n+i_{j}) such that, for some 0 < k ≤ m, q_{k} ∈ F. We can organize the run segments collected so for via following definitions.

- Let predecessor(q_{m},j) = q_{0}.
- Let run(s,0)= s_{0},...,s_{n-1},s and, for j > 0, run(q_{m},j)= q_{1},...,q_{m}

Now the above run segments will be put together to make an infinite accepting run of A. Consider a tree whose set of nodes is ∪_{j≥0} L_{i_{j}} × {j}. The root is (s,0) and parent of a node (q,j) is (predecessor(q,j), j-1). This tree is infinite, finitely branching, and fully connected. Therefore, by Kőnig's lemma, there exists an infinite path (q_{0},0),(q_{1},1),(q_{2},2),... in the tree. Therefore, following is an accepting run of A

run(q_{0},0)⋅run(q_{1},1)⋅run(q_{2},2)⋅...

Hence, by infinite pigeonhole principle, w is accepted by A.

=== L(A) ⊆ L(A') ===
Proof: The definition of projection function Pr can be extended such that in the second argument it can accept a finite word. For some set of states S, finite word w, and symbol a, let Pr(S,aw) = Pr(Pr(S,a),w) and Pr(S,ε) = S. Let w ∈ L(A) and ρ=q_{0},q_{1},... be an accepting run of A on w. First, we will prove following useful lemma.

Lemma 1
There is an index n such that q_{n} ∈ F and, for all m ≥ n there exist a k > m, such that Pr({ q_{n} },w(n,k)) = Pr({ q_{m} },w(m,k)).
Proof: Pr({ q_{n} },w(n,k)) ⊇ Pr({ q_{m} },w(m,k)) holds because there is a path from q_{n} to q_{m}. We will prove the converse by contradiction. Lets assume for all n, there is a m ≥ n such that for all k > m, Pr({ q_{n} },w(n,k)) ⊃ Pr({ q_{m} },w(m,k)) holds. Lets suppose p is the number of states in A. Therefore, there is a strictly increasing sequence of indexes n_{0},n_{1},... ,n_{p} such that, for all k > n_{p}, Pr({ q_{n_{i}} },w(n_{i},k)) ⊃ Pr({ q_{n_{i+1}} },w(n_{i+1},k)). Therefore,Pr({ q_{n_{p}} },w(n_{p},k)) = ∅. Contradiction.

In any run, A' can only once make a non-deterministic choice that is when it chooses to take a Δ_{2} transition and rest of the execution of A' is deterministic. Let n be such that it satisfies lemma 1. We make A' to take Δ_{2} transition at nth step. So, we define a run ρ'=S_{0},...,S_{n-1},({q_{n}},∅),(L_{1},R_{1}),(L_{2},R_{2}),... of A' on word w. We will show that ρ' is an accepting run. L_{i} ≠ ∅ because there is an infinite run of A passing through q_{n}. So, we are only left to show that L_{i}=R_{i} occurs infinitely often. Suppose contrary then there exists an index m such that, for all i ≥ m, L_{i}≠R_{i}. Let j > m such that q_{j+n} ∈ F therefore q_{j+n} ∈ R_{j}. By lemma 1, there exist k > j such that L_{k} = Pr({ q_{n} },w(n,k+n)) = Pr({ q_{j+n} },w(j+n,k+n)) ⊆ R_{k}. So, L_{k}=R_{k}. A contradiction has been derived. Hence, ρ' is an accepting run and w ∈ L(A').
