= Co-Büchi automaton =

In automata theory, a co-Büchi automaton is a variant of Büchi automaton. The only difference is the accepting condition: a Co-Büchi automaton accepts an infinite word $w$ if there exists a run, such that all the states occurring infinitely often in the run are in the final state set $F$. In contrast, a Büchi automaton accepts a word $w$ if there exists a run, such that states in the final state set $F$ are passed through infinitely often.

(Deterministic) Co-Büchi automata are strictly weaker than (nondeterministic) Büchi automata.

== Formal definition ==
Formally, a deterministic co-Büchi automaton is a tuple $\mathcal{A} = (Q,\Sigma,\delta,q_0,F)$ that consists of the following components:

- $Q$ is a finite set. The elements of $Q$ are called the states of $\mathcal{A}$.
- $\Sigma$ is a finite set called the alphabet of $\mathcal{A}$.
- $\delta : Q \times \Sigma \rightarrow Q$ is the transition function of $\mathcal{A}$.
- $q_0$ is an element of $Q$, called the initial state.
- $F\subseteq Q$ is the final state set. $\mathcal{A}$ accepts exactly those words $w$ with the run $\rho(w)$, in which all of the infinitely often occurring states in $\rho(w)$ are in $F$.

In a non-deterministic co-Büchi automaton, the transition function $\delta$ is replaced with a transition relation $\Delta$. The initial state $q_0$ is replaced with an initial state set $Q_0$. Generally, the term co-Büchi automaton refers to the non-deterministic co-Büchi automaton.

For more comprehensive formalism see also ω-automaton.

== Acceptance Condition ==
The acceptance condition of a co-Büchi automaton is formally

$\exists i \forall j:\; j\geq i \quad \rho(w_j) \in F.$

The Büchi acceptance condition is the complement of the co-Büchi acceptance condition:

$\forall i \exists j:\; j\geq i \quad \rho(w_j) \in F.$

== Properties ==
Co-Büchi automata are closed under union, intersection, projection and determinization.
