= Michael O. Rabin =

Israeli mathematician and computer scientist (1931–2026)

Michael Oser Rabin
- מִיכָאֵל עוזר רַבִּין
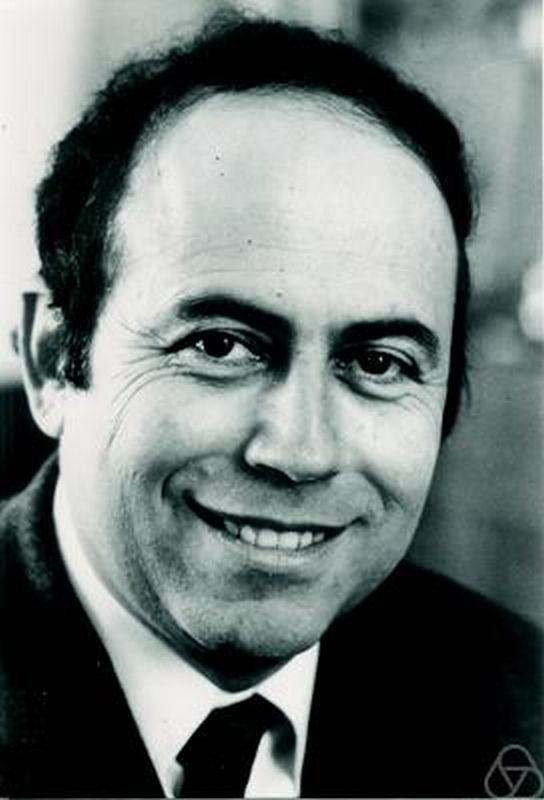
- Born: September 1, 1931; Breslau, Lower Silesia, Prussia, Germany
- Died: April 14, 2026 (aged 94); Jerusalem
- Education: Hebrew University (BS, MS); University of Pennsylvania; Princeton University (PhD)
- Known for: Rabin cryptosystem Rabin fingerprint Rabin signature algorithm Rabin–Karp string search algorithm Rabin–Scott powerset construction Adian–Rabin theorem Berlekamp–Rabin algorithm Miller–Rabin primality test Hyper-encryption; Infinite-tree automaton Decidability of S2S; Nondeterministic finite automata Oblivious transfer Probabilistic automaton Pumping lemma Randomized algorithms Two-way finite automaton Rabin automaton Verifiable random function
- Awards: Weizmann Prize (1959); Turing Award (1976); Harvey Prize (1980); Gibbs lecture (1985); Israel Prize (1995); IEEE Computer Society Charles Babbage Award (2000); Paris Kanellakis Award (2003); EMET Prize (2004); Gödel Lecture (2004); Dan David Prize (2010); Dijkstra Prize (2015)
- Scientific career
- Fields: Computer science
- Workplaces: Harvard University; Hebrew University of Jerusalem; Columbia University
- Thesis: Recursive Unsolvability of Group Theoretic Problems (1957)
- Doctoral advisor: Alonzo Church
- Doctoral students: Judit Bar-Ilan; Dov Gabbay; Moshé Machover; Saharon Shelah; Michael A. Bender

Michael Oser Rabin (Hebrew: מִיכָאֵל עוזר רַבִּין; September 1, 1931 – April 14, 2026) was an Israeli-American computer scientist who was co-recipient, with Dana Scott, of the 1976 ACM Turing Award for their work on computational complexity.

== Life and career ==
=== Early life and education ===
Rabin was born in 1931 in Breslau, Lower Silesia, Prussia, Germany (today Wrocław, in Poland), the son of a rabbi. In 1935, he emigrated with his family to Mandatory Palestine. As a young boy, he was very interested in mathematics and his father sent him to the best high school in Haifa, where he studied under mathematician Elisha Netanyahu, who was then a high school teacher.

He graduated from the Hebrew Reali School in Haifa in 1948, and was drafted into the army during the 1948 Arab–Israeli War. The mathematician Abraham Fraenkel, who was a professor of mathematics in Jerusalem, intervened with the army command, and Rabin was discharged to study at the university in 1949. Afterwards, he received an M.Sc from Hebrew University of Jerusalem. He began graduate studies at the University of Pennsylvania before receiving a Ph.D. from Princeton University in 1956.

=== Career ===
In the late 1950s, Rabin was invited for a summer to do research for IBM at the Lamb Estate in Westchester County, New York, with other promising mathematicians and scientists. It was there that he and Dana Scott wrote the paper "Finite Automata and Their Decision Problems". Soon, using nondeterministic automata, they were able to re-prove Kleene's result that finite state machines exactly accept regular languages.

As to the origins of what was to become computational complexity theory, the next summer Rabin returned to the Lamb Estate. John McCarthy posed a puzzle to him about spies, guards, and passwords, which Rabin studied and soon after he wrote an article, "Degree of Difficulty of Computing a Function and Hierarchy of Recursive Sets".

Nondeterministic machines have become a key concept in computational complexity theory, particularly with the description of the complexity classes P and NP.

He then returned to Jerusalem, researching logic, and working on the foundations of what would later be known as computer science. He was an associate professor and the head of the Institute of Mathematics at the Hebrew University at 29 years old, and a full professor by 33. Rabin recalls, "There was absolutely no appreciation of the work on the issues of computing. Mathematicians did not recognize the emerging new field".

In 1960, Rabin was invited by Edward F. Moore to work at Bell Labs, where Rabin introduced probabilistic automata that employ coin tosses to decide which state transitions to take. He showed examples of regular languages that required a very large number of states, but for which you get an exponential reduction of the number of states with probabilistic automata.

Rabin was a Visiting Associate Professor of Mathematics at the University of California, Berkeley in the 1961–62 school year and at MIT for the 1962-1963 school year. Before moving to Harvard University as Gordon McKay Professor of Computer Science in 1981, he was a professor at the Hebrew University.

In 1966 (published in conference proceedings in 1967), Rabin introduced the notion of polynomial time (introduced independently and very shortly before by Cobham and Edmonds).

In 1969, Rabin introduced infinite-tree automata and proved that the monadic second-order theory of n successors (S2S when n = 2) is decidable. A key component of the proof implicitly showed determinacy of parity games, which lie in the third level of the Borel hierarchy.

In 1975, Rabin finished his tenure as Rector of the Hebrew University of Jerusalem and went to the Massachusetts Institute of Technology in the USA as a visiting professor. While there, Rabin invented the Miller–Rabin primality test, a randomized algorithm that can determine very quickly (but with a tiny probability of error) whether a number is prime. Rabin's method was based on previous work of Gary Miller that solved the problem deterministically with the assumption that the generalized Riemann hypothesis is true, but Rabin's version of the test made no such assumption. Fast primality testing is key in the successful implementation of most public-key cryptography, and in 2003 Miller, Rabin, Robert M. Solovay, and Volker Strassen were given the Paris Kanellakis Award for their work on primality testing.

In 1976 Rabin was invited by Joseph Traub to meet at Carnegie Mellon University and presented the primality test, which Traub called "revolutionary".

In 1978, Rabin invented the Rabin signature algorithm, the first asymmetric cryptosystem whose security was proved equivalent to the intractability of integer factorization.

In 1981, Rabin reinvented a weak variant of the technique of oblivious transfer invented by Wiesner under the name of multiplexing, allowing a sender to transmit a message to a receiver where the receiver has some probability between 0 and 1 of learning the message, with the sender being unaware whether the receiver was able to do so.

In 1987, Rabin, together with Richard Karp, created one of the most well-known efficient string search algorithms, the Rabin–Karp string search algorithm, known for its rolling hash.

Rabin's subsequent research concentrated on computer security. During the spring semester of 2007, he was a visiting professor at Columbia University teaching Introduction to Cryptography. He retired from full-time academic life as the Thomas J. Watson Sr. Professor of Computer Science, Emeritus at Harvard University and Professor of Computer Science (Emeritus) at Hebrew University.

=== Personal life and death ===
Rabin died on April 14, 2026, at the age of 94.

His daughter, Tal Rabin, is also a distinguished computer scientist.

== Awards and honours ==
Rabin was a foreign member of the United States National Academy of Sciences, a member of the American Philosophical Society, a member of the American Academy of Arts and Sciences, a member of the French Academy of Sciences, and a foreign member of the Royal Society.

In 1976, the Turing Award was awarded jointly to Rabin and Dana Scott for a paper written in 1959, the citation for which states that the award was granted:

For their joint paper "Finite Automata and Their Decision Problems," which introduced the idea of nondeterministic machines, which has proved to be an enormously valuable concept. Their (Scott & Rabin) [sic] classic paper has been a continuous source of inspiration for subsequent work in this field.

In 1995, Rabin was awarded the Israel Prize, in computer sciences. In 2010, Rabin was awarded the Tel Aviv University Dan David Prize ("Future" category), jointly with Leonard Kleinrock and Gordon E. Moore, for Computers and Telecommunications. Rabin was awarded an Honorary Doctor of Science from Harvard University in 2017.

== See also ==
- Oblivious transfer
- Rabin automaton
- Rabin fingerprint
- Hyper-encryption
- List of Israel Prize recipients
- List of pioneers in computer science
