= Büchi's problem =

Unsolved problem in mathematics

Unsolved problem in mathematics
Is every sufficiently large sequence of square numbers with constant second difference necessarily a sequence of consecutive square numbers?
More unsolved problems in mathematics

In number theory, Büchi's problem, also known as the n squares' problem, is an open problem named after the Swiss mathematician Julius Richard Büchi. It asks whether there is a positive integer M such that every sequence of M or more integer squares, whose second difference is constant and equal to 2, is necessarily a sequence of squares of the form (x + i)^{2}, i = 1, 2, ..., M,... for some integer x. In 1983, Douglas Hensley observed that Büchi's problem is equivalent to the following: Does there exist a positive integer M such that, for all integers x and a, the quantity (x + n)^{2} + a cannot be a square for more than M consecutive values of n, unless a = 0?

== Statement of Büchi's problem ==
Büchi's problem can be stated in the following way: Does there exist a positive integer M such that the system of equations

$$\begin{cases}
x_2^2-2x_1^2+x_0^2=2\\
x_3^2-2x_2^2+x_1^2=2\\
{}\quad\vdots\\
x_{M-1}^2-2x_{M-2}^2+x_{M-3}^2=2
\end{cases}$$

has only solutions satisfying $x_n^2=(x_0+n)^2.$

Since the first difference of the sequence $\sigma=(x_n^2)_{n=0,\dots,M-1}$ is the sequence $\Delta^{(1)}(\sigma)=(x_{n+1}^2-x_n^2)_{n=0,\dots,M-2}$, the second difference of $\sigma$ is

$$\Delta^{(2)}(\sigma)=((x_{n+2}^2-x_{n+1}^2)-(x_{n+1}^2-x_n^2))_{n=0,\dots,M-3}=(x_{n+2}^2-2x_{n+1}^2+x_n^2)_{n=0,\dots,M-3}.$$

Therefore, the above system of equations is equivalent to the single equation

$$\Delta^{(2)}(\sigma)=(2)_{n=0,\dots,M-3}$$

where the unknown is the sequence $\sigma$.

== Examples ==
Observe that for any integer x we have

$$(\star)\qquad(x+2)^2-2(x+1)^2+x^2=2.$$

Hence the equation $x_2^2-2x_1^2+x_0^2=2$ has solutions, called trivial Büchi sequences of length three, such that $x_2^2=(x_0+2)^2$ and $x_1^2=(x_0+1)^2$. For example, the sequences (2, 3, 4) and (2, −3, 4) are trivial Büchi sequences. A nontrivial Büchi sequence of length three is given for example by the sequence (0, 7, 10), as it satisfies 10^{2} − 2·7^{2} + 0^{2} = 2, while 0^{2}, 7^{2} and 10^{2} are not consecutive squares.

Replacing x by x + 1 in equation $(\star)$, we obtain $(x+3)^2-2(x+2)^2+(x+1)^2=2$. Hence the system of equations

$$\begin{cases}
x_2^2-2x_1^2+x_0^2=2\\
x_3^2-2x_2^2+x_1^2=2
\end{cases}$$

has trivial Büchi solutions of length 4, namely the one satisfying $x_n^2=(x_0+n)^2$ for n = 0, 1, 2, 3. In 1983, D. Hensley showed that there are infinitely many nontrivial Büchi sequences of length four. It is not known whether there exist any non-trivial Büchi sequences of length five (Indeed, Büchi asked originally the question only for M = 5.).

== Original motivation ==
A positive answer to Büchi's problem would imply, using the negative answer to Hilbert's tenth problem by Yuri Matiyasevich, that there is no algorithm to decide whether a system of diagonal quadratic forms with integer coefficients represents an integer tuple. Indeed, Büchi observed that squaring, therefore multiplication, would be existentially definable in the integers over the first-order language having two symbols of constant for 0 and 1, a symbol of function for the sum, and a symbol of relation P to express that an integer is a square.

== Some results ==
Paul Vojta proved in 1999 that a positive answer to Büchi's Problem would follow from a positive answer to a weak version of the Bombieri–Lang conjecture. In the same article, he proves that the analogue of Büchi's Problem for the field of meromorphic functions over the complex numbers has a positive answer. Positive answers to analogues of Büchi's Problem in various other rings of functions have been obtained since then (in the case of rings of functions, one adds the hypothesis that not all x_{n} are constant).

A positive answer was claimed in 2024 by Stanley Yao Xiao and is awaiting peer review as of July 2025.
