= Julius Richard Büchi =

Swiss logician and mathematician

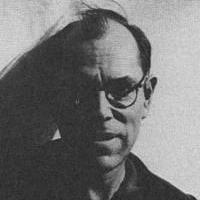
- Born: 31 January 1924
- Died: 1984 (aged 59–60)
- Education: ETH Zurich (PhD)

Julius Richard Büchi (1924–1984) was a Swiss logician and mathematician.

He received his Dr. sc. nat. in 1950 at ETH Zurich under the supervision of Paul Bernays and Ferdinand Gonseth. Shortly afterwards he went to Purdue University in Lafayette, Indiana. He and his first student Lawrence Landweber had a major influence on the development of theoretical computer science.

Together with his friend Saunders Mac Lane, a student of Paul Bernays as well, Büchi published numerous celebrated works. He invented what is now known as the Büchi automaton, a finite-state machine accepting certain sets of infinite sequences of characters known as omega-regular languages. The "n squares' problem", known also as Büchi's problem, is an open problem from number theory, closely related to Hilbert's tenth problem.

== Selected publications ==
- Finite Automata, Their Algebras and Grammars – Towards a Theory of Formal Expressions. Published posthumously, Springer, New York 1989.
- Collected Works of J. Richard Büchi. Edited by Saunders Mac Lane and Dirk Siefkes. Springer, New York 1990.
