= Transition (computer science) =

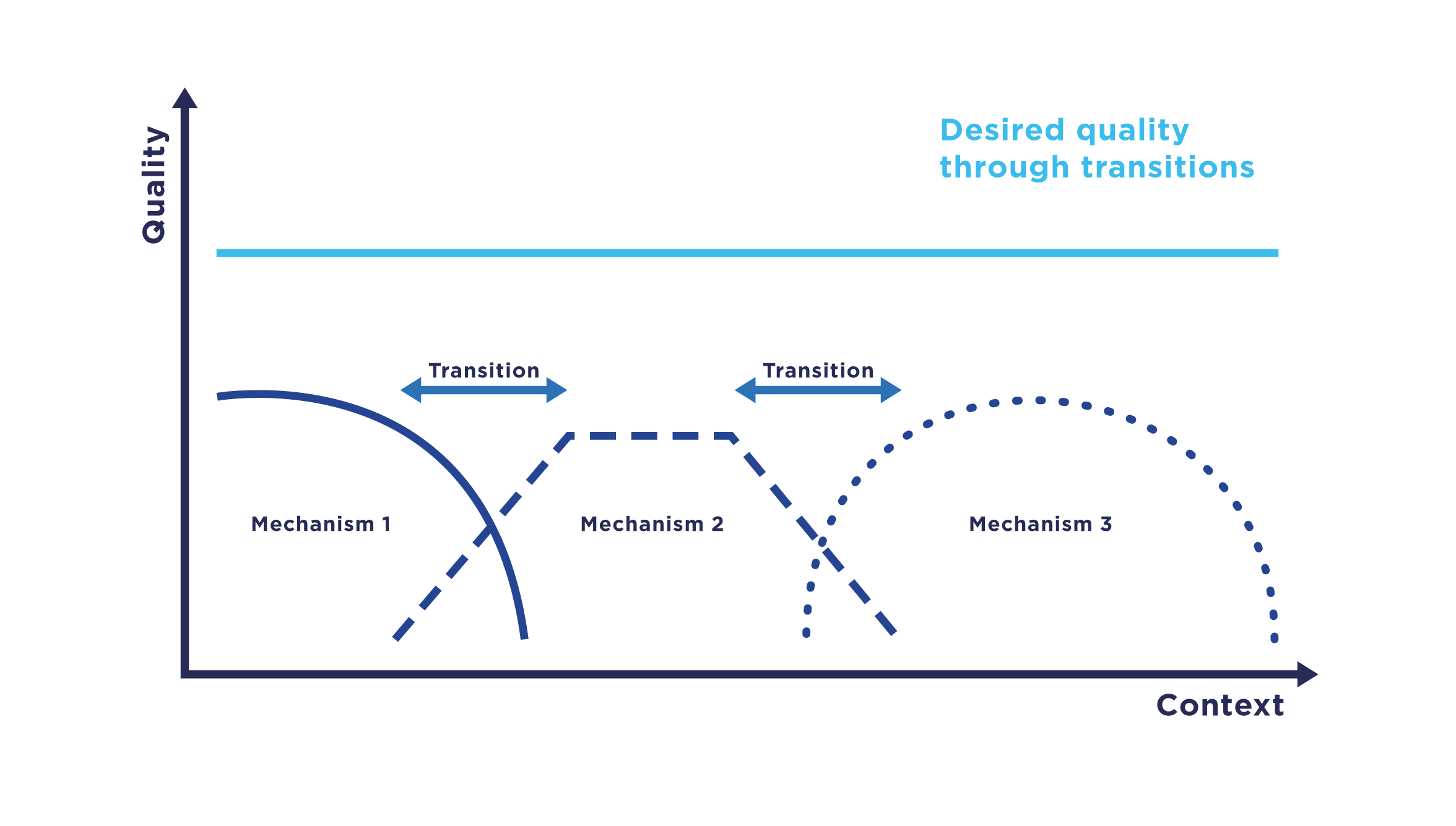
The aim of a transition is to provide a seamless, consistent quality, e.g., QoS in a communication system.

Transition refers to a computer science paradigm in the context of communication systems which describes the change of communication mechanisms, i.e., functions of a communication system, in particular, service and protocol components. In a transition, communication mechanisms within a system are replaced by functionally comparable mechanisms with the aim to ensure the highest possible quality, e.g., as captured by the quality of service.

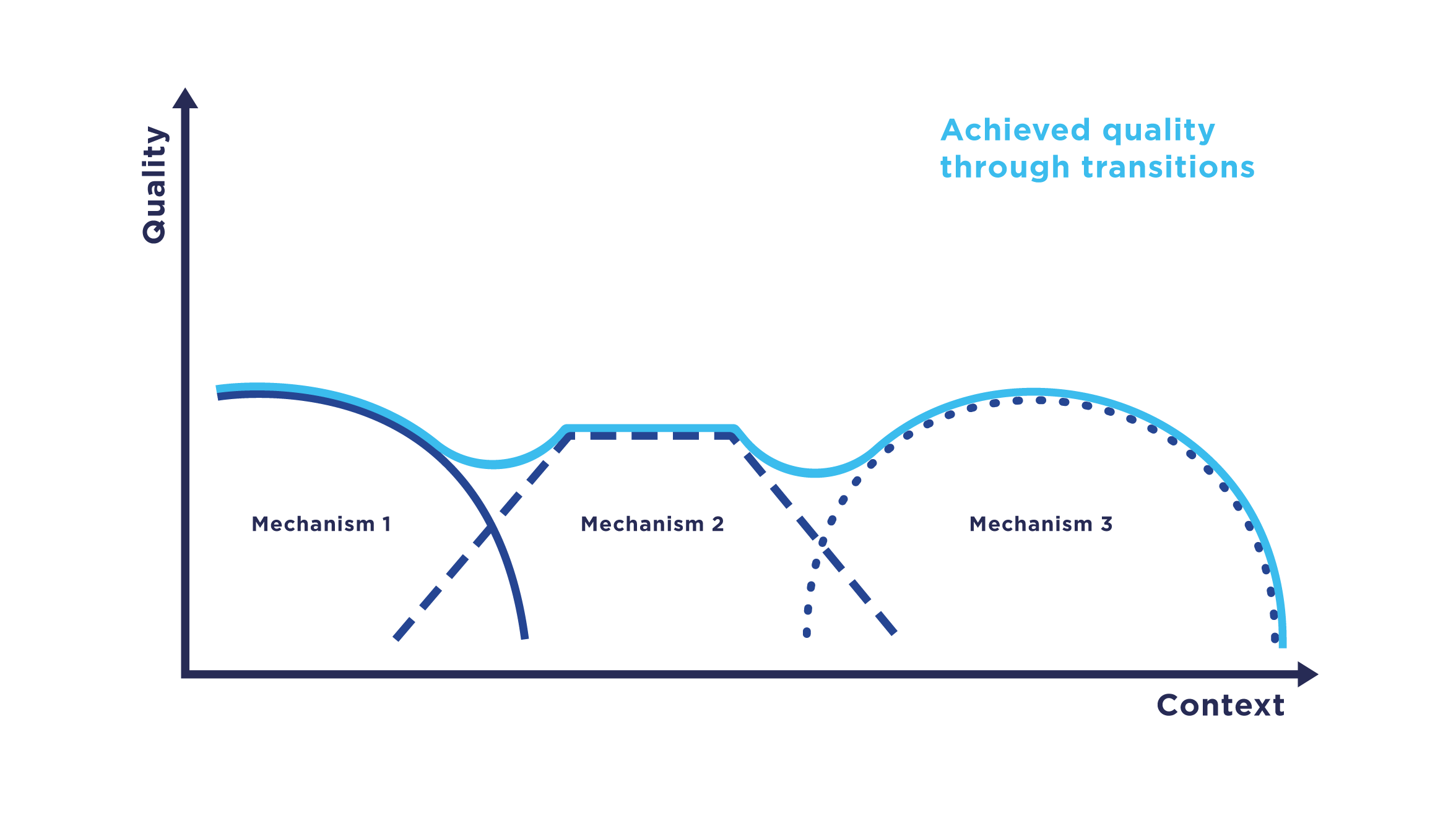
Transitions and the subsequent adaptation of communication systems enable the optimization of g conditions.

Transitions enable communication systems to adapt to changing conditions during runtime. This change in conditions can, for example, be a rapid increase in the load on a certain service that may be caused, e.g., by large gatherings of people with mobile devices. A transition often impacts multiple mechanisms at different communication layers of a layered architecture.

Mechanisms are given as conceptual elements of a networked communication system and are linked to specific functional units, for example, as a service or protocol component. In some cases, a mechanism can also comprise an entire protocol. For example on the transmission layer, LTE can be regarded as such a mechanism. Following this definition, there exist numerous communication mechanisms that are partly equivalent in their basic functionality, such as Wi-Fi, Bluetooth and Zigbee for local wireless networks and UMTS and LTE for broadband wireless connections. For example, LTE and Wi-Fi have equivalent basic functionality, but they are technologically significantly different in their design and operation. Mechanisms affected by transitions are often components of a protocol or service. For example, in case of video streaming/transmission, the use of different video data encoding can be carried out depending on the available data transmission rate. These changes are controlled and implemented by transitions; A research example is a context-aware video adaptation service to support mobile video applications. Through analyzing the current processes in a communication system, it is possible to determine which transitions need to be executed at which communication layer in order to meet the quality requirements. In order for communication systems to adapt to the respective framework conditions, architectural approaches of self-organizing, adaptive systems can be used, such as the MAPE cycle (Monitor-Analyze-Plan-Execute). This central concept of Autonomic Computing can be used to determine the state of the communication system, to analyze the monitoring data and to plan and execute the necessary transition(s). A central goal is that users do not consciously perceive a transition while running applications and that the functionality of the used services is perceived as smooth and fluid.

== Recent research ==
The study of new and fundamental design methods, models and techniques that enable automated, coordinated and cross-layer transitions between functionally similar mechanisms within a communication system is the main goal of a collaborative research center funded by the German research foundation (DFG). The DFG collaborative research center 1053 MAKI - Multi-mechanism Adaptation for the future Internet - focuses on research questions in the following areas: (i) Fundamental research on transition methods, (ii) Techniques for adapting transition-capable communication systems on the basis of achieved and targeted quality, and (iii) specific and exemplary transitions in communication systems as regarded from different technical perspectives.

A formalization of the concept of transitions that captures the features and relations within a communication system to express and optimize the decision making process that is associated with such a system is given in. The associated building blocks comprise (i) Dynamic Software Product Lines, (ii) Markov Decision Processes and (iii) Utility Design. While Dynamic Software Product Lines provide a method to concisely capture a large configuration space and to specify run time variability of adaptive systems, Markov Decision Processes provide a mathematical tool to define and plan transitions between available communication mechanisms. Finally, utility functions quantify the performance of individual configurations of the transition-based communication system and provide the means to optimize the performance in such a system.

Applications of the idea of transitions have found their way to wireless sensor networks and mobile networks, distributed reactive programming, WiFi firmware modification, planning of autonomic computing systems, analysis of CDNs, flexible extensions of the ISO OSI stack, 5G mmWave vehicular communications, the analysis of MapReduce-like parallel systems, scheduling of Multipath TCP, adaptivity for beam training in 802.11ad, operator placement in dynamic user environments, DASH video player analysis, adaptive bitrate streaming and complex event processing on mobile devices.
