= Deterministic automaton =

In computer science, a deterministic automaton is a concept of automata theory where the outcome of a transition from one state to another is determined by the input.

A common deterministic automaton is a deterministic finite automaton (DFA) which is a finite state machine, where for each pair of state and input symbol there is one and only one transition to a next state. DFAs recognize the set of regular languages and no other languages.

A standard way to build a deterministic finite automaton from a nondeterministic finite automaton is the powerset construction.
