= Omega-regular language =

Class of languages studied in formal language theory in computer science

In computer science and formal language theory, the ω-regular languages are a class of ω-languages that generalize the definition of regular languages to infinite words. As regular languages accept finite strings (such as strings beginning in an a, or strings alternating between a and b), ω-regular languages accept infinite words (such as, infinite sequences beginning in an a, or infinite sequences alternating between a and b).

== Formal definition ==
Let A be a language. Denote by A^{ω} the set whose elements are obtained by concatenating words from A infinitely many times, i.e the set of functions $\omega \to A$.

The class of ω-regular ω-languages is defined inductively as follows

- A^{ω}, where A is a regular language not containing the empty string, is ω-regular;
- AB, the concatenation of a regular language A and an ω-regular language B (Note that BA is not well-defined), is ω-regular;
- A ∪ B, where A and B are ω-regular languages (this rule can only be applied finitely many times), is ω-regular.

Note that if A is regular, A^{ω} is not necessarily ω-regular, since A could be for example {ε}, the set containing only the empty string, in which case A^{ω}=A, which is not an ω-language and therefore not an ω-regular language.

It is a straightforward consequence of the definition that the ω-regular languages are precisely the ω-languages of the form A_{1}B_{1}^{ω} ∪ ... ∪ A_{n}B_{n}^{ω} for some n, where the A_{i}s and B_{i}s are regular languages and the B_{i}s do not contain the empty string.

== Equivalence to Büchi automaton ==
Theorem—An ω-language is recognized by a Büchi automaton if and only if it is an ω-regular language.

Proof

Every ω-regular language is recognized by a nondeterministic Büchi automaton; the translation is constructive. Using the closure properties of Büchi automata and structural induction over the definition of ω-regular language, it can be easily shown that a Büchi automaton can be constructed for any given ω-regular language.

Conversely, for a given Büchi automaton A = (Q, Σ, δ, I, F), we construct an ω-regular language and then we will show that this language is recognized by A. For an ω-word w = a_{1}a_{2}... let w(i,j) be the finite segment a_{i+1}...a_{j−1}a_{j} of w. For every q, q' ∈ Q, we define a regular language L_{q,q'} that is accepted by the finite automaton (Q, Σ, δ, q, {q'}).

Lemma— We claim that the Büchi automaton A recognizes the language ⋃_{q∈I,q′∈F} L_{q,q'} (L_{q',q'} − {ε} )^{ω}.

Proof

Let's suppose word w ∈ L(A) and q_{0},q_{1},q_{2},... is an accepting run of A on w. Therefore, q_{0} is in I and there must be a state q' in F such that q' occurs infinitely often in the accepting run. Let's pick the strictly increasing infinite sequence of indexes i_{0},i_{1},i_{2}... such that, for all k≥0, q_{i_{k}} is q'. Therefore, w(0,i_{0})∈L_{q_{0},q'} and, for all k≥0, w(i_{k},i_{k+1})∈L_{q',q'} . Therefore, w ∈ L_{q_{0},q'} (L_{q',q'} )^{ω}.

Conversely, suppose w ∈ L_{q,q'} (L_{q',q'} − {ε} )^{ω} for some q∈I and q'∈F. Therefore, there is an infinite and strictly increasing sequence i_{0},i_{1},i_{2}... such that w(0,i_{0}) ∈ L_{q,q'} and, for all k≥0, w(i_{k},i_{k+1})∈L_{q',q'} . By definition of L_{q,q'}, there is a finite run of A from q to q' on word w(0,i_{0}). For all k≥0, there is a finite run of A from q' to q' on word w(i_{k},i_{k+1}). By this construction, there is a run of A, which starts from q and in which q' occurs infinitely often. Hence, w ∈ L(A).

== Equivalence to Monadic second-order logic ==
Büchi showed in 1962 that ω-regular languages are precisely the ones definable in a particular monadic second-order logic called S1S.
