= Kenneth McMillan =

Kenneth McMillan may refer to:

- Kenneth G. McMillan (born 1942), United States politician (R-IL)
- Kenneth L. McMillan, American computer scientist
- Kenneth McMillan (actor) (1932–1989), American actor (sometimes credited as Ken McMillan)

== See also ==
- Kenneth MacMillan (1929–1992), British ballet dancer and choreographer
