= CTL* =

Branching-time logic that is a superset of LTL and CTL

CTL* is a superset of computational tree logic (CTL) and linear temporal logic (LTL). It freely combines path quantifiers and temporal operators. Like CTL, CTL* is a branching-time logic. The formal semantics of CTL* formulae are defined with respect to a given Kripke structure.

== History ==
LTL had been proposed for the verification of computer programs, first by Amir Pnueli in 1977. Four years later in 1981 E. M. Clarke and E. A. Emerson invented CTL and CTL model checking. CTL* was defined by E. A. Emerson and Joseph Y. Halpern in 1983.

CTL and LTL were developed independently before CTL*. Both sublogics have become standards in the model checking community, while CTL* is of practical importance because it provides an expressive testbed for representing and comparing these and other logics. This is surprising because the computational complexity of model checking in CTL* is not worse than that of LTL: they both lie in PSPACE.

== Syntax ==
The language of well-formed CTL* formulae is generated by the following unambiguous (with respect to bracketing) context-free grammar:

$$\Phi::=\bot  \mid \top  \mid p \mid (\neg\Phi) \mid (\Phi\land\Phi) \mid (\Phi\lor\Phi) \mid
(\Phi\Rightarrow\Phi) \mid (\Phi\Leftrightarrow\Phi) \mid A\phi \mid E\phi$$
$$\phi::=\Phi \mid (\neg\phi) \mid (\phi\land\phi) \mid (\phi\lor\phi) \mid
(\phi\Rightarrow\phi) \mid (\phi\Leftrightarrow\phi) \mid X\phi \mid F\phi \mid G\phi \mid [\phi U \phi]$$

where $p$ ranges over a set of atomic formulas. Valid CTL*-formulae are built using the nonterminal $\Phi$. These formulae are called state formulae, while those created by the symbol $\phi$ are called path formulae. (The above grammar contains some redundancies; for example $\Phi\lor\Phi$ as well as implication and equivalence can be defined as just for Boolean algebras (or propositional logic) from negation and conjunction, and the temporal operators X and U are sufficient to define the other two.)

The operators basically are the same as in CTL. However, in CTL, every temporal operator ($X, F, G, U$) has to be directly preceded by a quantifier, while in CTL* this is not required. The universal path quantifier may be defined in CTL* in the same way as for classical predicate calculus $A\phi = \neg E \neg \phi$, although this is not possible in the CTL fragment.

=== Examples of formulae ===
- CTL* formula that is neither in LTL or in CTL: $EX(p) \land AFG(p)$
- LTL formula that is not in CTL: $\ AFG(p)$
- CTL formula that is not in LTL: $\ EX(p)$
- CTL* formula that is in CTL and LTL: $\ AG(p)$

Remark: When taking LTL as subset of CTL*, any LTL formula is implicitly prefixed with the universal path quantifier $A$.

== Semantics ==
The semantics of CTL* are defined with respect to some Kripke structure. As the names imply, state formulae are interpreted with respect to the states of this structure, while path formulae are interpreted over paths on it.

=== State formulae ===
If a state $s$ of the Kripke structure satisfies a state formula $\Phi$ it is denoted $s\models\Phi$. This relation is defined inductively as follows:

1. $\Big( (\mathcal{M}, s) \models \top \Big) \land \Big( (\mathcal{M}, s) \not\models \bot \Big)$
2. $\Big( (\mathcal{M}, s) \models p \Big) \Leftrightarrow \Big( p \in L(s) \Big)$
3. $\Big( (\mathcal{M}, s) \models \neg\Phi \Big) \Leftrightarrow \Big( (\mathcal{M}, s) \not\models \Phi \Big)$
4. $\Big( (\mathcal{M}, s) \models \Phi_1 \land \Phi_2 \Big) \Leftrightarrow \Big( \big((\mathcal{M}, s) \models \Phi_1 \big) \land \big((\mathcal{M}, s) \models \Phi_2 \big) \Big)$
5. $\Big( (\mathcal{M}, s) \models \Phi_1 \lor \Phi_2 \Big) \Leftrightarrow \Big( \big((\mathcal{M}, s) \models \Phi_1 \big) \lor \big((\mathcal{M}, s) \models \Phi_2 \big) \Big)$
6. $\Big( (\mathcal{M}, s) \models \Phi_1 \Rightarrow \Phi_2 \Big) \Leftrightarrow \Big( \big((\mathcal{M}, s) \not\models \Phi_1 \big) \lor \big((\mathcal{M}, s) \models \Phi_2 \big) \Big)$
7. $\bigg( (\mathcal{M}, s) \models \Phi_1 \Leftrightarrow \Phi_2 \bigg) \Leftrightarrow \bigg( \Big( \big((\mathcal{M}, s) \models \Phi_1 \big) \land \big((\mathcal{M}, s) \models \Phi_2 \big) \Big) \lor \Big( \neg \big((\mathcal{M}, s) \models \Phi_1 \big) \land \neg \big((\mathcal{M}, s) \models \Phi_2 \big) \Big) \bigg)$
8. $\Big( (\mathcal{M}, s) \models A\phi \Big) \Leftrightarrow \Big(\pi\models\phi$ for all paths $\ \pi$ starting in $s\Big)$
9. $\Big( (\mathcal{M}, s) \models E\phi \Big) \Leftrightarrow \Big(\pi\models\phi$ for some path $\ \pi$ starting in $s\Big)$

=== Path formulae ===
The satisfaction relation $\pi\models\phi$ for path formulae $\ \phi$ and a path $\pi = s_0 \to s_1 \to \cdots$ is also defined inductively. For this, let $\ \pi[n]$ denote the sub-path $s_n \to s_{n+1} \to \cdots$:

1. $\Big( \pi \models \Phi \Big) \Leftrightarrow \Big((\mathcal{M}, s_0) \models \Phi\Big)$
2. $\Big( \pi \models \neg\phi \Big) \Leftrightarrow \Big( \pi \not\models \phi \Big)$
3. $\Big( \pi \models \phi_1 \land \phi_2 \Big) \Leftrightarrow \Big( \big(\pi \models \phi_1 \big) \land \big(\pi \models \phi_2 \big) \Big)$
4. $\Big( \pi \models \phi_1 \lor \phi_2 \Big) \Leftrightarrow \Big( \big(\pi \models \phi_1 \big) \lor \big(\pi \models \phi_2 \big) \Big)$
5. $\Big( \pi \models \phi_1 \Rightarrow \phi_2 \Big) \Leftrightarrow \Big( \big(\pi \not\models \phi_1 \big) \lor \big(\pi \models \phi_2 \big) \Big)$
6. $\bigg( \pi \models \phi_1 \Leftrightarrow \phi_2 \bigg) \Leftrightarrow \bigg( \Big( \big(\pi \models \phi_1 \big) \land \big(\pi \models \phi_2 \big) \Big) \lor \Big( \neg \big(\pi \models \phi_1 \big) \land \neg \big(\pi \models \phi_2 \big) \Big) \bigg)$
7. $\Big( \pi \models X\phi \Big) \Leftrightarrow \Big( \pi[1] \models \phi \Big)$
8. $\Big( \pi \models F\phi \Big) \Leftrightarrow \Big( \exists n\geqslant 0: \pi[n] \models \phi \Big)$
9. $\Big( \pi \models G\phi \Big) \Leftrightarrow \Big( \forall n\geqslant 0: \pi[n] \models \phi \Big)$
10. $\Big( \pi \models [\phi_1U\phi_2] \Big) \Leftrightarrow \Big( \exists n\geqslant 0: \big(\pi[n] \models \phi_2 \land \forall 0\leqslant k < n:~ \pi[k] \models \phi_1 \big)\Big)$

== Decision problems ==
CTL* model checking (of an input formula on a fixed model) is PSPACE-complete and the satisfiability problem is 2EXPTIME-complete.

== See also ==
- Temporal logic
- Kripke structure
- Model checking
- Reo Coordination Language
