= Generalized Büchi automaton =

In automata theory, a generalized Büchi automaton is a variant of a Büchi automaton. The difference with the Büchi automaton is the accepting condition, which is determined by a set of sets of states. A run is accepted by the automaton if it visits at least one state of every set of the accepting condition infinitely often. Generalized Büchi automata are equivalent in expressive power to Büchi automata; a transformation is given here.

In formal verification, the model checking method needs to obtain an automaton from a LTL formula that specifies the desired program property. There are algorithms that translate a LTL formula into a generalized Büchi automaton. for this purpose. The notion of generalized Büchi automaton was introduced specifically for this translation.

== Formal definition ==
Formally, a generalized Büchi automaton is a tuple A = (Q,Σ,Δ,Q_{0}, $\cal F$) that consists of the following components:

- Q is a finite set. The elements of Q are called the states of A.
- Σ is a finite set called the alphabet of A.
- Δ: Q × Σ → 2^{Q} is a function, called the transition relation of A.
- Q_{0} is a subset of Q, called the initial states.
- $\cal F$ is the acceptance condition, which is made up of zero or more accepting sets. Each accepting set $F_i \in \cal F$ is a subset of Q.

A accepts exactly those runs in which the set of infinitely often occurring states contains at least one state from each accepting set $F_i \in \cal F$. Note that there may be no accepting sets, in which case any infinite run trivially satisfies this property.

For more comprehensive formalism see also ω-automaton.

== Labeled generalized Büchi automaton ==
Labeled generalized Büchi automaton is another variation in which input is matched to labels on the states rather than on the transitions. It was introduced by Gerth et al.

Formally, a labeled generalized Büchi automaton is a tuple A = (Q, Σ, L, Δ,Q_{0},$\cal F$) that consists of the following components:

- Q is a finite set. The elements of Q are called the states of A.
- Σ is a finite set called the alphabet of A.
- L: Q → 2^{Σ} is a function, called the labeling function of A.
- Δ: Q → 2^{Q} is a function, called the transition relation of A.
- Q_{0} is a subset of Q, called the initial states.
- $\cal F$ is the acceptance condition, which is made up of zero or more accepting sets. Each accepting set $F_i \in \cal F$ is a subset of Q.

Let w = a_{1}a_{2} ... be an ω-word over the alphabet Σ. The sequence r_{1}, r_{2}, ... is a run of A on the word w if r_{1} ∈ Q_{0} and for each i ≥ 0, r_{i+1} ∈ Δ(r_{i}) and a_{i} ∈ L(r_{i}). A accepts exactly those runs in which the set of infinitely often occurring states contains at least one state from each accepting set $F_i \in \cal F$. Note that there may be no accepting sets, in which case any infinite run trivially satisfies this property.

To obtain the non-labeled version, the labels are moved from the nodes to the incoming transitions.
