= Berkeley Networks =

Intelligent Switch Manufacturing startup company

- Type: Privately held company
- Industry: Computer hardware
- Founded: 1996
- Founder: Ravi Sethi
- Defunct: 1998
- Fate: Acquired
- Successor: FORE Systems
- Headquarters: Milpitas, California, United States
- Products: Network switches

Berkeley Networks was an American startup company that built intelligent switches targeted for the enterprise computer networking market segment.

== History ==
The company was established in 1996. The name of the company comes from the school University of California, Berkeley. The founder and CEO, Dr. Ravi Sethi, received his Ph.D. and MBA from the University of California, Berkeley.

Berkeley Networks was acquired by Pittsburgh-based FORE Systems for US$250 million, and then which later was acquired by London-based GEC (now Marconi Corporation plc) for £2.8 Billion.

== See also ==
- Telecommunication
- Communications protocols
