= Fair computational tree logic =

Fair computational tree logic is conventional computational tree logic studied with explicit fairness constraints.

== Weak fairness / justice ==
This declares conditions such as all processes execute infinitely often. If you consider the processes to be P_{i}, then the condition becomes:

$$\bigwedge GFP_{i}$$

== Strong fairness / compassion ==
Here, if a process is requesting a resource infinitely often (R), it should be allowed to get the resource (C) infinitely often:

$$\bigwedge( GFR \longrightarrow GFC)$$

== Model checking for fair CTL ==
Consider a Kripke model with set of states F. A path $\pi = s_o, s_1 \dots$ is considered a fair path, if and only if the path includes all members of F infinitely often.
Fair CTL model checking restricts the checks to only fair paths. There are two kinds of fair quantifiers:

1. M_{f}, s_{i} |= A$\phi$ if and only if $\phi$ holds in all fair paths.

2. M_{f}, s_{i} |= E$\phi$ if and only if $\phi$ holds in one or more fair paths.

A fair state is one from which at least one fair path originates. This translates to M_{f}, s |= EGtrue.

== SCC-based approach ==
A strongly connected component (SCC) of a directed graph is a maximal strongly connected subgraph—all the nodes are reachable from each other. A fair SCC is one that has an edge into at least one node for each of the fair conditions.

To check for fair EG for any formula,

1. Compute what is called the denotation of the formula φ: the set of states such that M, s.
2. Restrict the model to the denotation.
3. Find the fair SCC.
4. Obtain the union of all 3 (above).
5. Compute the states that can reach the union.

== Emerson Lei algorithm ==
The fix point characterization of Exist Globally is given by: {{{1}}}, which is basically the limit applied according to Kleene's theorem. To fair paths, it becomes {{{1}}}, which means the formula holds in the current state and the next states and the next to next states until it meets all the members of the fair conditions. This means that, the condition is equivalent to a sort of accepting point where the accepting condition is the entire set of Fair conditions.
