= FORE Systems =

FORE Systems, Inc.
- Industry: Computer networking
- Founded: 1990; 36 years ago in Warrendale, Pennsylvania, United States
- Founder: Francois Bitz; Onat Menzilcioglu; Robert Sansom; Eric Cooper
- Defunct: 1999
- Fate: Acquired by Marconi Communications
- Website: fore.com at the Wayback Machine (archived 1998-01-16)

FORE Systems, Inc., was a computer network switching equipment company based in Pittsburgh, Pennsylvania. Founded in 1990 to supply Asynchronous Transfer Mode (ATM) cards for workstation computers, it soon branched out to become a major supplier in the ATM switch market and the extended those product lines to add Internet Protocol switching and other devices.

FORE was purchased by the British General Electric Company (GEC) in 1999, just before the dot-com bubble, which eventually drove GEC to reform the company as Marconi. Ericsson purchased most of Marconi in 2006.

== History ==
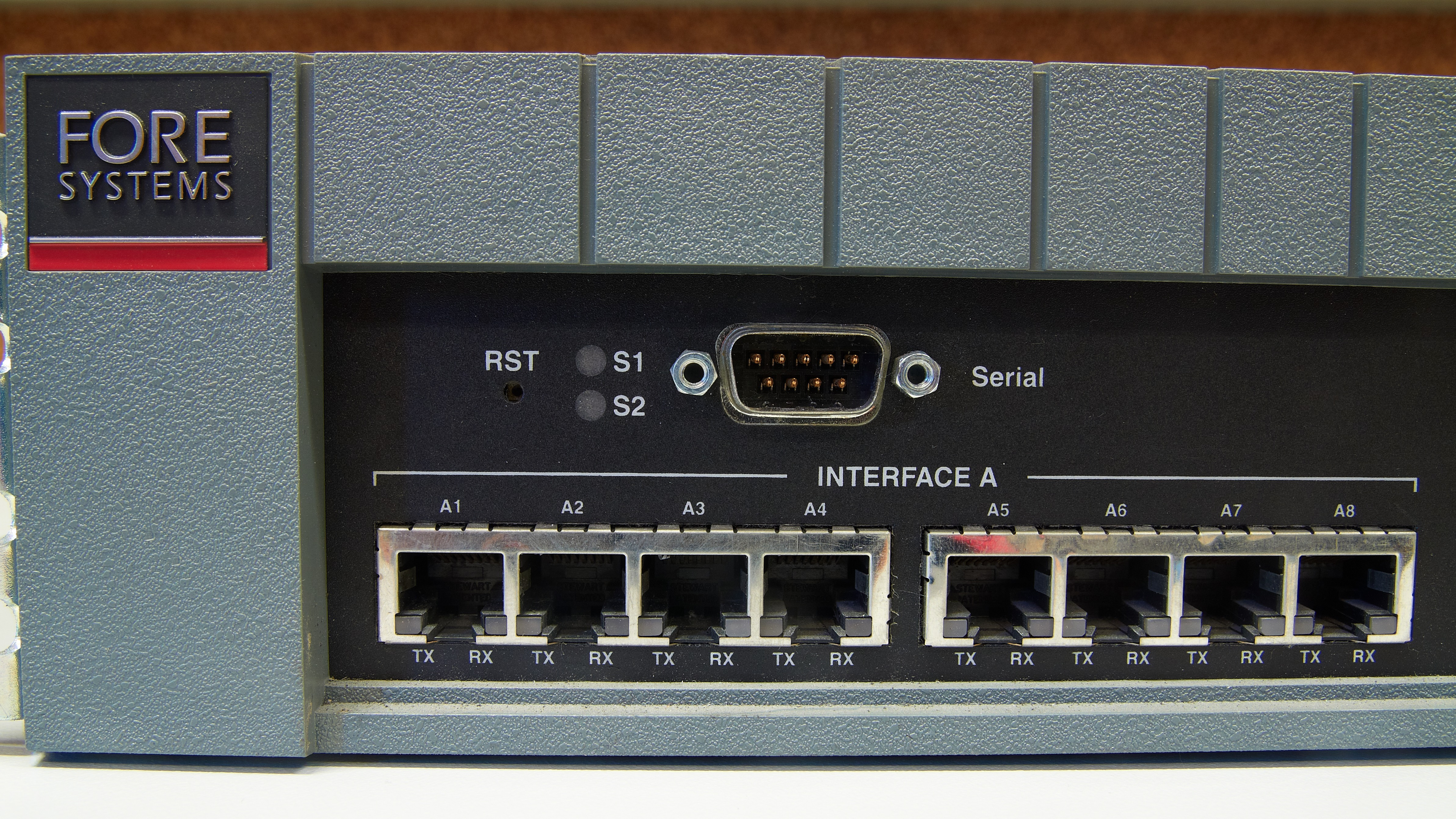
FORE Systems ForeRunner LE 25 ATM switch.

Francois Bitz, Onat Menzilcioglu, Robert Sansom and Eric Cooper were researchers at Carnegie Mellon University who felt their 1989 project to supply a US Naval Research Laboratories Request for Development had commercial potential. They formed FORE, using the first letter of their first names, in 1990 in the Pittsburgh suburb of Warrendale, Pennsylvania. The company went public in May 1994.

FORE initially produced Asynchronous Transfer Mode (ATM) network interface cards for Sun Microsystems' SBus and DEC's TURBOchannel based computers in addition to ATM adapters for Silicon Graphics computers. FORE's first ATM switch – the ASX-100 – connected sixteen ATM ports each with a capacity of 155.52 Mbit/s. Later interface adapters for the follow-on ASX-200, ASX-1000, and ASX-4000 switches allowed connections up to 2.5 Gbit/s.

The company established a leading position in the market for ATM switching equipment. FORE created a memory-based ATM switch that captured a strong portion of the ATM market. Other technologies include Internet Protocol, Gigabit Ethernet and Firewall switching. FORE Systems also supported advanced dynamic routing protocols such as the ForeThought Private Network Network Interface (PNNI) and the ATM Forum's PNNI protocol.

FORE was acquired by London-based GEC (now Marconi Corporation plc) on 26 April 1999 to complement its Marconi Communications business and to increase its presence in North America, the world's largest telecoms market. This was near the peak of the dot-com bubble. The £2.8bn (US$4.5bn) ($8.9 billion today) price tag for FORE and the £1.3n spent on Reltec a month earlier took a heavy toll on Marconi following the burst of the bubble in 2000/2001.

In July 2001 Marconi plc suffered a 54% drop in its share price following suspension of trading of its shares, a profits warning and redundancies. The company survived following a relaunch as Marconi Corporation plc in a debt-for-equity swap whereby the firm's creditors received 99.5% of the new company's shares.

In 2006, Ericsson purchased most of Marconi, including the part that used to be FORE Systems. In 2008, Ericsson closed the Warrendale plant and sold off the corporate HQ.

== Acquisition history ==
1999
Euristix Ltd., a telecommunications software company based in Dublin, Ireland for $81 million. Euristix delivered network management and Intelligent Networking software expertise.

1998
Berkeley Networks Inc. Fore Systems Inc. acquired the closely held Berkeley Networks Inc. for $250 million in stock and cash, acquiring equipment that speeds data on computer networks run by Microsoft's Windows NT software. Fore, the No. 7 maker of networking equipment, issued 8.48 million shares for all the shares of Berkeley Net.

1996
Scalable Networks Inc. FORE Systems Inc. acquired Scalable Networks Inc., an O'Hara Township, Pennsylvania developer of high-performance technology used to access asynchronous transfer mode (ATM) networks for about $34 million. The deal adds a line of local area network (LAN) equipment to FORE's product line and is likely to enhance the company's position in the global ATM market.

1995
Alantec Inc. FORE Systems Inc. acquired Alantec Inc. for about $768 million. Alantec, a San Jose, California manufacturer of Ethernet and FDDI switching hubs, provided IEEE 802 Ethernet to ATM aggregation.

1995
Applied Network Technology, Inc. FORE Systems Inc. acquired Applied Network Technology Inc. for about $35 million. ANT, a Westford, Massachusetts manufacturer of Ethernet and Fast Ethernet switching hubs, provided high density/low cost IEEE 802 Ethernet to ATM aggregation.

== See also ==
- Telecommunication
- Communications protocols
