= Constraint automaton =

In computer science, Constraint automata are a formalism to describe the behavior and possible data flow in coordination models. It was introduced by Arbab et al. as a variation of finite automata for model checking Reo connector circuits.

Constraint automata can be considered generalizations of probabilistic automata, in which data constraints, instead of probabilities, label state transitions and influence their firing.

== See also ==
- Model checking
- Finite automata
- Probabilistic automaton
- Colored Petri net
