= Safety and liveness properties =

Concepts in theoretical computer science

Properties of an execution of a computer program—particularly for concurrent and distributed systems—have long been formulated by giving safety properties ("bad things don't happen") and liveness properties ("good things do happen").

A program is totally correct with respect to a precondition $P$ and postcondition $Q$ if any execution started in a state satisfying $P$ terminates in a state satisfying $Q$. Total correctness is a conjunction of a safety property and a liveness property:

- The safety property prohibits these "bad things": executions that start in a state satisfying $P$ and terminate in a final state that does not satisfy $Q$. For a program $C$, this safety property is usually written using the Hoare triple $\{P\} C \{Q\}$.
- The liveness property, the "good thing", is that execution that starts in a state satisfying $P$ terminates.

Note that a bad thing is discrete, (Note: i.e. it has finite duration) since it happens at a particular place during execution. A "good thing" need not be discrete, but the liveness property of termination is discrete.

Formal definitions that were ultimately proposed for safety properties and liveness properties demonstrated that this decomposition is not only intuitively appealing but is also complete: all properties of an execution are a conjunction of safety and liveness properties. Moreover, undertaking the decomposition can be helpful, because the formal definitions enable a proof that different methods must be used for verifying safety properties versus for verifying liveness properties. (Note: The paper received the 2018 Dijkstra Prize ("for outstanding papers on the principles of distributed computing whose significance and impact on the theory and/or practice of distributed computing have been evident for at least a decade"), for the formal decomposition into safety and liveness properties was crucial to future research into proving properties of programs.)

== Safety ==
A safety property proscribes discrete bad things from occurring during an execution. A safety property thus characterizes what is permitted by stating what is prohibited. The requirement that the bad thing be discrete means that a bad thing occurring during execution necessarily occurs at some identifiable point.

Examples of a discrete bad thing that could be used to define a safety property include:

- An execution that starts in a state satisfying a given precondition terminates, but the final state does not satisfy the required postcondition;
- An execution of two concurrent processes, where the program counters for both processes designate statements within a critical section;
- An execution of two concurrent processes where each process is waiting for another to change state (known as deadlock).

An execution of a program can be described formally by giving the infinite sequence of program states that results as execution proceeds, where the last state for a terminating program is repeated infinitely. For a program of interest, let $S$ denote the set of possible program states, $S^*$ denote the set of finite sequences of program states, and $S^\omega$ denote the set of infinite sequences of program states. The relation $\sigma\le\tau$ holds for sequences $\sigma$ and $\tau$ iff $\sigma$ is a prefix of $\tau$ or $\sigma$ equals $\tau$.

A property of a program is the set of allowed executions.

The essential characteristic of a safety property $SP$ is: If some execution $\sigma$ does not satisfy $SP$ then the defining bad thing for that safety property occurs at some point in $\sigma$. Notice that after such a bad thing, if further execution results in an execution $\sigma^\prime$, then $\sigma^\prime$ also does not satisfy $SP$, since the bad thing in $\sigma$ also occurs in $\sigma^\prime$. We take this inference about the irremediability of bad things to be the defining characteristic for $SP$ to be a safety property. Formalizing this in predicate logic gives a formal definition for $SP$ being a safety property.

$$\forall \sigma\in S^\omega: \sigma \notin SP\implies (\exists \beta \le \sigma: (\forall \tau \in S^\omega: \beta\tau \notin SP))$$

This formal definition for safety properties implies that if an execution $\sigma$ satisfies a safety property $SP$ then every prefix of $\sigma$ (with the last state repeated) also satisfies $SP$.

== Liveness ==
A liveness property prescribes good things for every execution or, equivalently, describes something that must happen during an execution. The good thing need not be discrete—it might involve an infinite number of steps. Examples of a good thing used to define a liveness property include:

- Termination of an execution that is started in a suitable state;
- Non-termination of an execution that is started in a suitable state;
- Guaranteed eventual entry to a critical section whenever entry is attempted;
- Fair access to a resource in the presence of contention.

The good thing in the first example is discrete but not in the others.

Producing an answer within a specified real-time bound is a safety property rather than a liveness property. This is because a discrete bad thing is being proscribed: a partial execution that reaches a state where the answer still has not been produced and the value of the clock (a state variable) violates the bound. Deadlock freedom is a safety property: the "bad thing" is a deadlock (which is discrete).

Most of the time, knowing that a program eventually does some "good thing" is not satisfactory; we want to know that the program performs the "good thing" within some number of steps or before some deadline. A property that gives a specific bound to the "good thing" is a safety property (as noted above), whereas the weaker property that merely asserts the bound exists is a liveness property. Proving such a liveness property is likely to be easier than proving the tighter safety property because proving the liveness property doesn't require the kind of detailed accounting that is required for proving the safety property.

To differ from a safety property, a liveness property $LP$ cannot rule out any finite prefix $\alpha \in S^*$ (Note: $S^*$ denotes the set of finite sequences of program states and $S^\omega$ the set of infinite sequences of program states.) of an execution (since such an $\alpha$ would be a "bad thing" and, thus, would be defining a safety property). That leads to defining a liveness property $LP$ to be a property that does not rule out any finite prefix.

$$\forall \alpha \in S^*: (\exists \tau \in S^\omega: \alpha\tau \in LP)$$

This definition does not restrict a good thing to being discrete—the good thing can involve all of $\tau$, which is an infinite-length execution.

== History ==
Lamport used the terms safety property and liveness property in his 1977 paper on proving the correctness of multiprocess (concurrent) programs. He borrowed the terms from Petri net theory, which was using the terms liveness and boundedness for describing how the assignment of a Petri net's "tokens" to its "places" could evolve; Petri net safety was a specific form of boundedness. Lamport subsequently developed a formal definition of safety for a NATO short course on distributed systems in Munich. It assumed that properties are invariant under stuttering. The formal definition of safety given above appears in a paper by Alpern and Schneider; the connection between the two formalizations of safety properties appears in a paper by Alpern, Demers, and Schneider.

Alpern and Schneider gives the formal definition for liveness, accompanied by a proof that all properties can be constructed using safety properties and liveness properties. That proof was inspired by Gordon Plotkin's insight that safety properties correspond to closed sets and liveness properties correspond to dense sets in a natural topology on the set $S^\omega$ of infinite sequences of program states. (Note: Private communication from Plotkin to Schneider.) Subsequently, Alpern and Schneider not only gave a Büchi automaton characterization for the formal definitions of safety properties and liveness properties but used these automata formulations to show that verification of safety properties would require an invariant and verification of liveness properties would require a well-foundedness argument. The correspondence between the kind of property (safety vs liveness) with kind of proof (invariance vs well-foundedness) was a strong argument that the decomposition of properties into safety and liveness (as opposed to some other partitioning) was a useful one—knowing the type of property to be proved dictated the type of proof that is required.
