= List of computer science conference acronyms =

This is a list of academic conferences in computer science, ordered by their acronyms or abbreviations.

== A ==
- AAAI – AAAI Conference on Artificial Intelligence
- AAMAS – International Conference on Autonomous Agents and Multiagent Systems
- ABZ – International Conference on Abstract State Machines, Alloy, B and Z
- ACL – Annual Meeting of the Association for Computational Linguistics
- ALGO – ALGO Conference
- AMCIS – Americas Conference on Information Systems
- ANTS – Algorithmic Number Theory Symposium
- ARES – International Conference on Availability, Reliability and Security
- ASIACRYPT – International Conference on the Theory and Application of Cryptology and Information Security
- ASP-DAC – Asia and South Pacific Design Automation Conference
- ASE – IEEE/ACM International Conference on Automated Software Engineering
- ASWEC – Australian Software Engineering Conference
- ATC – ACM SIGOPS Annual Technical Conference
- ATMOS – Workshop on Algorithmic Approaches for Transportation Modeling, Optimization, and Systems

== C ==
- CADE – Conference on Automated Deduction
- CAV – Computer Aided Verification
- CC – International Conference on Compiler Construction
- CCSC – Consortium for Computing Sciences in Colleges
- CEC - Congress on Evolutionary Computation
- CHES – Workshop on Cryptographic Hardware and Embedded Systems
- CHI – ACM Conference on Human Factors in Computing Systems
- CIAA – International Conference on Implementation and Application of Automata
- CIBB – International Conference on Computational Intelligence Methods for Bioinformatics and Biostatistics
- CICLing – International Conference on Intelligent Text Processing and Computational Linguistics
- CIDR – Conference on Innovative Data Systems Research
- CIKM – Conference on Information and Knowledge Management
- CONCUR - International Conference on Concurrency Theory
- CRYPTO – International Cryptology Conference
- CVPR – Conference on Computer Vision and Pattern Recognition

== D ==
- DAC – Design Automation Conference
- DATE – Design, Automation, and Test in Europe
- DCFS – International Workshop on Descriptional Complexity of Formal Systems
- DISC – International Symposium on Distributed Computing
- DLT – International Conference on Developments in Language Theory
- DSN – International Conference on Dependable Systems and Networks

== E ==
- ECAI – European Conference on Artificial Intelligence
- ECCB - European Conference on Computational Biology
- ECCO – Conference of the European Chapter on Combinatorial Optimization
- ECIS – European Conference on Information Systems
- ECML PKDD – European Conference on Machine Learning and Principles and Practice of Knowledge Discovery in Databases
- ECOOP – European Conference on Object-Oriented Programming
- ECSS – European Computer Science Summit
- ER - International Conference on Conceptual Modeling
- ESA – European Symposium on Algorithms
- ESOP – European Symposium on Programming
- ESWC – Extended (formerly European) Semantic Web Conference
- ETAPS – European Joint Conferences on Theory and Practice of Software
- EUROCRYPT – International Conference on the Theory and Applications of Cryptographic Techniques
- EuroGP - European Conference on Genetic Programming. (Part of EvoStar.)
- Eurographics – Annual Conference of the European Association for Computer Graphics
- EvoApplications - European Conference on the Applications of Evolutionary Computation. (Part of EvoStar.)
- EvoCOP - European Conference on Evolutionary Computation in Combinatorial Optimization. (Part of EvoStar.)
- EvoMUSART - International Conference on Computational Intelligence in Music, Sound, Art and Design. (Part of EvoStar.) Also known as Artificial Intelligence in Music, Sound, Art and Design.
- EvoStar or Evo* - EvoStar
- EWSN – European Conference on Wireless Sensor Networks

== F ==
- FASE – International Conference on Fundamental Approaches to Software Engineering
- FAST – USENIX Conference on File and Storage Technologies
- FCRC – Federated Computing Research Conference
- FLoC – Federated Logic Conference
- FOCS – IEEE Symposium on Foundations of Computer Science
- FOGA - Foundations of Genetic Algorithms
- FORTE – IFIP International Conference on Formal Techniques for Networked and Distributed Systems
- FoSSaCS – International Conference on Foundations of Software Science and Computation Structures
- FSE – Fast Software Encryption Workshop
- FTP – International Workshop on First-Order Theorem Proving

== G ==
- GD – International Symposium on Graph Drawing
- GECCO - Genetic and Evolutionary Computation Conference
- GlobeCom – IEEE Global Communications Conference
- GraphiCon – International Conference on Computer Graphics and Vision

== H ==
- HICSS – Hawaii International Conference on System Sciences
- HiPC – International Conference on High Performance Computing
- HOPL – History of Programming Languages Conference
- Hot Interconnects – IEEE Symposium on High Performance Interconnects

== I ==
- ICALP – International Colloquium on Automata, Languages and Programming
- ICAPS – International Conference on Automated Planning and Scheduling
- ICASSP – International Conference on Acoustics, Speech, and Signal Processing
- ICCAD – International Conference on Computer-Aided Design
- ICC – IEEE International Conference on Communications
- ICCIT – International Conference on Computer and Information Technology
- ICCV – International Conference on Computer Vision
- ICDCS – International Conference on Distributed Computing Systems
- ICFP – International Conference on Functional Programming
- ICIS – International Conference on Information Systems
- ICL – International Conference on Interactive Computer Aided Learning
- ICLP – International Conference on Logic Programming
- ICML – International Conference on Machine Learning
- ICPADS – International Conference on Parallel and Distributed Systems
- ICSE – International Conference on Software Engineering
- ICSOC – International Conference on Service Oriented Computing
- ICSR – International Conference on Software Reuse
- ICTer – International Conference on Advances in ICT for Emerging Regions
- ICWS – International Conference on Web Services
- IJCAI – International Joint Conference on Artificial Intelligence
- IJCAR – International Joint Conference on Automated Reasoning
- IndoCrypt – International Conference on Cryptology in India
- IPDPS – IEEE International Parallel and Distributed Processing Symposium
- IPSN – ACM/IEEE International Conference on Information Processing in Sensor Networks
- ISAAC – International Symposium on Algorithms and Computation
- ISCA – International Symposium on Computer Architecture
- ISCAS – IEEE International Symposium on Circuits and Systems
- ISMAR – IEEE International Symposium on Mixed and Augmented Reality
- ISMB - Intelligent Systems for Molecular Biology
- ISWC – International Semantic Web Conference
- ISPD – International Symposium on Physical Design
- ISSCC – International Solid-State Circuits Conference
- ISWC – International Symposium on Wearable Computers
- ITNG - International Conference on Information Technology: New Generations

== K ==
- KDD – ACM SIGKDD Conference on Knowledge Discovery and Data Mining

== L ==
- LICS – IEEE Symposium on Logic in Computer Science
- LREC – International Conference on Language Resources and Evaluation

== M ==
- MM – ACM International Conference on Multimedia
- MECO – Mediterranean Conference on Embedded Computing
- MobiCom – ACM International Conference on Mobile Computing and Networking
- MobiHoc – ACM International Symposium on Mobile Ad Hoc Networking and Computing
- MobileHCI – Conference on Human-Computer Interaction with Mobile Devices and Services

== N ==
- NAACL – Annual Conference of the North American Chapter of the Association for Computational Linguistics
- NIPS – Conference on Neural Information Processing Systems
- NeurIPS – Conference on Neural Information Processing Systems
- NIME – New Interfaces for Musical Expression

== O ==
- OOPSLA – Conference on Object-Oriented Programming, Systems, Languages, and Applications

== P ==
- PACIS – Pacific Asia Conference on Information Systems
- PIMRC – International Symposium on Personal, Indoor and Mobile Radio Communications
- PKC – International Workshop on Practice and Theory in Public Key Cryptography
- PKDD – European Conference on Principles and Practice of Knowledge Discovery in Databases
- PLDI – ACM SIGPLAN Conference on Programming Language Design and Implementation
- PLoP – Pattern Languages of Programs
- PODC – ACM Symposium on Principles of Distributed Computing
- PODS – ACM Symposium on Principles of Database Systems
- POPL – Symposium on Principles of Programming Languages
- POST – Conference on Principles of Security and Trust
- PPoPP – ACM SIGPLAN Symposium on Principles and Practice of Parallel Programming
- PPSN - Parallel Problem Solving from Nature
- PSB – Pacific Symposium on Biocomputing

== R ==
- RECOMB – Research in Computational Molecular Biology
- REV – International Conference on Remote Engineering and Virtual Instrumentation
- RSA – RSA Conference

== S ==
- SAC – ACM SIGAPP Symposium on Applied Computing
- SAC – Selected Areas in Cryptography
- SEAMS – Software Engineering for Adaptive and Self-Managing Systems
- SEFM – International Conference on Software Engineering and Formal Methods
- SenSys – ACM Conference on Embedded Networked Sensor Systems
- SIGCOMM – ACM SIGCOMM Conference
- SIGCSE – ACM Technical Symposium on Computer Science Education
- SIGDOC – ACM International Conference on Design of Communication
- SIGGRAPH – International Conference on Computer Graphics and Interactive Techniques
- SIGIR – Annual International ACM SIGIR Conference
- SIGMOD – ACM SIGMOD Conference
- SOFSEM – International Conference on Current Trends in Theory and Practice of Computer Science
- SPAA – ACM Symposium on Parallelism in Algorithms and Architectures
- SRDS – IEEE International Symposium on Reliable Distributed Systems
- STACS – Symposium on Theoretical Aspects of Computer Science
- STOC – ACM Symposium on Theory of Computing
- SWAT – Scandinavian Symposium and Workshops on Algorithm Theory

== T ==
- TABLEAUX – International Conference on Automated Reasoning with Analytic Tableaux and Related Methods
- TACAS – International Conference on Tools and Algorithms for the Construction and Analysis of Systems
- TAMC – International Conference on Theory and Applications of Models of Computation
- TCC – Theory of Cryptography Conference
- TPHOLs – Theorem Proving in Higher-Order Logics
- TSD – Text, Speech and Dialogue

== V ==
- VIS – IEEE Visualization
- VLDB – International Conference on Very Large Data Bases

== W ==
- WABI – Workshop on Algorithms in Bioinformatics
- WADS – Algorithms and Data Structures Symposium
- WAE – Workshop on Algorithms Engineering
- WAOA – Workshop on Approximation and Online Algorithms
- WDAG – Workshop on Distributed Algorithms on Graphs
- WikiSym – International Symposium on Wikis and Open Collaboration
- WINE – Conference on Web and Internet Economics
- WMSCI – World Multiconference on Systemics, Cybernetics and Informatics
- WWW – World Wide Web Conference

== Z ==
- ZUM – Z User Meeting

== See also ==
- List of computer science conferences for more conferences organised by field.
- Conference acronym index for conferences and workshops published in LNCS, LNAI and LNBI proceedings series by Springer.
