= List of IEEE conferences =

The Institute of Electrical and Electronics Engineers sponsors more than 1,600 annual conferences and meetings worldwide. IEEE is also highly involved in the technical program development of numerous events including trade events, training workshops, job fairs, and other programs.

== List ==
- ACM/IEEE Supercomputing Conference
- ARITH Symposium on Computer Arithmetic
- Asia and South Pacific Design Automation Conference
- Conference on Computer Vision and Pattern Recognition
- Custom Integrated Circuits Conference
- Design Automation and Test in Europe
- Design Automation Conference
- Electronic Components and Technology Conference (ECTC)
- Global Communications Conference
- Hot Interconnects
- IEEE Congress on Evolutionary Computation
- IEEE MTT-S International Microwave Symposium
- IEEE Visualization
- International Carnahan Conference on Security Technology
- International Conference on Acoustics, Speech, and Signal Processing
- IEEE International Conference on Automation Science and Engineering
- International Conference on Big Data and Smart Computing (BigComp)
- International Conference on Communications
- International Conference on Computer Vision
- International Conference on Computer-Aided Design
- IEEE International Conference on Data Engineering (IEEE ICDE)
- International Conference on Data Mining
- International Conference on Software Engineering and Formal Methods
- International Conference on Web Services
- International Electron Devices Meeting
- International Forum on Strategic Technology
- International Frequency Control Symposium
- International Solid-State Circuits Conference
- International Symposium on Circuits and Systems
- International Symposium on Information Theory
- International Symposium on Mixed and Augmented Reality
- International Symposium on Personal, Indoor and Mobile Radio Communications
- International Symposium on Physical Design
- International Symposium on Power Semiconductor Devices and ICs (ISPSD)
- Iran Workshop on Communication and Information Theory
- Photovoltaic Specialists Conference
- Symposia on VLSI Technology and Circuits
- Symposium on Foundations of Computer Science
- Symposium on Logic in Computer Science
- Vehicular Technology Conference

== See also ==
- List of electrical engineering journals
