= Massoud Pedram =

Iranian American computer engineer

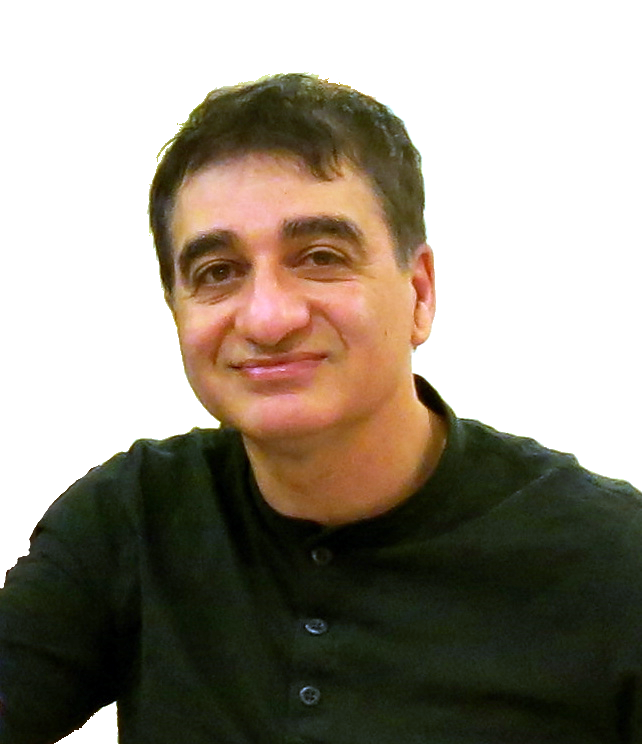
- Born: Ahvaz, Iran
- Citizenship: United States; Iran
- Education: California Institute of Technology; University of California, Berkeley
- Occupations: Stephen and Etta Varra Professor of Ming Hsieh Department of Electrical Engineering of the University of Southern California of University of Southern California
- Known for: Power optimization (EDA)
- Awards: PECASE; IEEE Fellow; ACM Distinguished Member; IEEE CAS Charles A. Desoer Technical Achievement Award
- Scientific career
- Fields: Computer Engineering
- Workplaces: University of Southern California
- Thesis: An Integrated Approach to Logic Synthesis and Physical Design (1991)
- Doctoral advisor: Ernest S. Kuh
- Doctoral students: Payam Heydari; Diana Marculescu
- Website: sportlab.usc.edu/~massoud

Massoud Pedram (Persian: مسعود پدرام) (born in Ahvaz) is an Iranian American computer engineer noted for his research in green computing, energy storage systems, low-power electronics and design, electronic design automation and quantum computing. In the early 1990s, Pedram pioneered an approach to designing VLSI circuits that considered physical effects during logic synthesis. He named this approach layout-driven logic synthesis, which was subsequently called physical synthesis and incorporated into the standard EDA design flows. Pedram's early work on this subject became a significant prior art reference in a litigation between Synopsys Inc. and Magma Design Automation.

== Biography ==
Massoud Pedram was born in Ahvaz, Khuzestan, Iran. He came to the United States to continue his higher education in 1983. He received a B.S. degree in electrical engineering from the California Institute of Technology in 1986 and M.S. and Ph.D. degrees in electrical engineering and computer sciences (EECS) from the University of California, Berkeley in 1989 and 1991, respectively. The EECS department of University of California, Berkeley, listed him as one of her distinguished alumni.

Pedram then joined the Ming Hsieh Department of Electrical Engineering in Viterbi School of Engineering of the University of Southern California, where he is currently the Stephen and Etta Varra Professor. Some of his doctoral students, including Diana Marculescu, Radu Marculescu and Payam Heydari have become notable academics.

== Professional services ==
Pedram has served on the technical program committee of a number of conferences, including the Design Automation Conference (DAC), Design, Automation & Test in Europe (DATE), Asia and South Pacific Design Automation Conference (ASP-DAC), International Conference on Computer-Aided Design (ICCAD), and International Conference on Hardware/Software Codesign and System Synthesis (CODES+ISSS). He served as the technical program chair and the general chair of the 2002 and 2003 International Symposium on Physical Design (ISPD) and the general chair of the 2007 International Symposium on Quality Electronic Design (ISQED). He served as the inaugural editor-in-chief (EiC) of the IEEE Journal on Emerging and Selected Topics in Circuits and Systems (JETCAS). He also served as the EiC of the ACM Transactions on Design Automation of Electronic Systems (TODAES). Pedram served as the IEEE Circuits and Systems Society Vice President (Publications) in 2006.

Pedram co-founded and served as the general co-chair of the first ACM International Workshop on Low Power Design in 1994. When this workshop merged with the IEEE Workshop on Low Power Electronics in 1996, Pedram served as a co-founder and the technical co-chair of the first International Symposium on Low Power Electronics and Design (ISLPED).

Pedram has been on the advisory board of several companies, including Atrenta Inc., Envis Corp, and Magma Design Automation.

== Awards ==
Pedram's awards and recognition have included:

- US National Science Foundation's Research Initiation Award (RIA) in 1992
- Young Investigator Award (NYI) in 1994
- Presidential Early Career Award for Scientists and Engineers (PECASE) in 1996
- IEEE Fellow "for contributions to the theory and practice of low-power design and CAD" in 2001
- ACM Distinguished Member in 2008
- IEEE CAS Charles A. Desoer Technical Achievement Award "for contributions to modeling and design of low power VLSI circuits and systems, and energy efficient computing" in 2015

Additionally, Pedram has been granted 10 US patents. He was one of ten principal investigators from academia in the United States who were selected by DARPA to fund for the Power Efficiency Revolution for Embedded Computing Technologies (PERFECT) program.

== Publications ==
Pedram has published four books, 13 book chapters, and more than 560 journal and conference papers. According to Google Scholar, his research have been cited more than 17,800 times till 2015. His publications have received a number of awards including two DAC Best Paper Awards, a Distinguished Paper Citation from ICCAD, three ICCD Best Paper Awards, two IEEE Transactions Best Paper Awards, and an ISLPED best paper award. At the 50th anniversary of the Design Automation Conference held in 2013, Pedram was recognized as one of the four DAC Prolific Authors (with 50+ papers) and the DAC Bronze Cited Author.

=== Books ===
- Pedram, Massoud; Rabaey, Jan, eds. (June 2002). Power Aware Design Methodologies. Springer Press. p. 521. ISBN 978-1402071522.
- Chang, Jui-Ming; Pedram, Massoud (June 1999). Power Optimization and Synthesis at Behavioral and System Levels Using Formal Methods. Springer Press. p. 167. ISBN 978-1461373681.
- Iman, Sasan; Pedram, Massoud (November 1997). Logic Synthesis for Low Power VLSI Designs. Springer Press. p. 236. ISBN 978-0792380764.
- Rabaey, Jan; Pedram, Massoud (November 1995). Low Power Design Methodologies. Springer Press. p. 367. ISBN 978-0792396307.
