= Outline of automation =

Overview of and topical guide to automation

The following outline is provided as an overview of and topical guide to automation:

Automation – use of control systems and information technologies to reduce the need for human work in the production of goods and services. In the scope of industrialization, automation is a step beyond mechanization.

== Essence of automation ==
- Control system – a device, or set of devices to manage, command, direct or regulate the behavior of other devices or systems.
- Industrial control system (ICS) – encompasses several types of control systems used in industrial production, including supervisory control and data acquisition (SCADA) systems, distributed control systems (DCS), and other smaller control system configurations such as skid-mounted programmable logic controllers (PLC) often found in industrial sectors and critical infrastructures.
- Industrialization – period of social and economic change that transforms a human group from an agrarian society into an industrial one.
- Numerical control (NC) – refers to the automation of machine tools that are operated by abstractly programmed commands encoded on a storage medium, as opposed to controlled manually via handwheels or levers, or mechanically automated via cams alone.
- Robotics – the branch of technology that deals with the design, construction, operation, structural disposition, manufacture and application of robots and computer systems for their control, sensory feedback, and information processing.

== Branches of automation ==
=== General purpose ===
- Autonomous automation – autonomous software agents to adapt the controllers of computer controlled industrial machinery and processes
- Banking automation
- Broadcast automation
- Building automation – advanced functionality provided by the control system of a building. A building automation system (BAS) is an example of a distributed control system.
  - Home automation – control system of a home.
  - Office automation – the varied computer machinery and software used to digitally create, collect, store, manipulate, and relay office information needed for accomplishing basic tasks such as business process automation and robotic process automation.
- Console automation
- Database automation
- Integrated library system
- Laboratory automation

=== Specific purpose ===
- Automated attendant
- Automated guided vehicle
- Autonomous mobile robot
- Automated highway system
- Automated pool cleaner
- Automated teller machine
- Automatic painting (robotic)
- Pop music automation
- Remotely operated vehicle
- Robotic lawn mower
- Telephone switchboard
- Vending machine

== Fields contributing to automation ==
- Cybernetics – the interdisciplinary study of the structure of regulatory systems.
- Cognitive science – interdisciplinary scientific study of the mind and its processes. It examines what cognition is, what it does and how it works.
- Robotics – the branch of technology that deals with the design, construction, operation, structural disposition, manufacture and application of robots and computer systems for their control, sensory feedback, and information processing.

== History of automation ==
- History of mass production – Prerequisites of mass production were interchangeable parts, machine tools and power, especially in the form of electricity. Mass production was popularized in the 1910s and 1920s by Henry Ford's Ford Motor Company, which introduced electric motors to the then-well-known technique of chain or sequential production.
- History of home automation

== Automated machines ==
- Machine to Machine
- OLE for process control (OPC)
- Process control – a statistics and engineering discipline that deals with architectures, mechanisms and algorithms for maintaining the output of a specific process within a desired range.
- Run Book Automation (RBA)
- Robot – a mechanical or virtual intelligent agent that can perform tasks automatically or with guidance, typically by remote control.

== Automated machine components ==
- Artificial intelligence – the intelligence of machines and the branch of computer science that aims to create it.
- Friendly artificial intelligence – an artificial intelligence that has a positive rather than negative effect on humanity, and the field of knowledge required to build such an artificial intelligence.

=== Automation tools ===
- Artificial neural network (ANN) – mathematical model or computational model that is inspired by the structure or functional aspects of biological neural networks.
- Human machine interface (HMI) – operator level local control panel that monitors field devices
- Laboratory information management system (LIMS) – software package that offers a set of key features that support a modern laboratory's operations.
- Industrial control system – encompasses several types of control systems used in industrial production, including supervisory control and data acquisition (SCADA) systems, distributed control systems (DCS), and other smaller control system configurations such as skid-mounted programmable logic controllers (PLC) often found in the industrial sectors and critical infrastructures.
  - Distributed control system (DCS) – control system usually of a manufacturing system, process or any kind of dynamic system, in which the controller elements are not central in location (like the brain) but are distributed throughout the system with each component sub-system controlled by one or more controllers.
  - Manufacturing execution system (MES) – system that manages manufacturing operations in a factory, including management of resources, scheduling production processes, dispatching production orders, execution of production orders, etc.
  - Programmable automation controller (PAC) – digital computer used for automation of electromechanical processes, such as control of machinery on factory assembly lines, amusement rides, or light fixtures.
  - Programmable logic controller (PLC)A Programmable Logic Controller, PLC or Programmable Controller is a digital computer used for automation of electromechanical processes, such as control of machinery on factory assembly lines, amusement rides, or light fixtures. The abbreviation "PLC" and the term "Programmable Logic Controller" are registered trademarks of the Allen-Bradley Company (Rockwell Automation). PLCs are used in many industries and machines. Unlike general-purpose computers, the PLC is designed for multiple inputs and output arrangements, extended temperature ranges, immunity to electrical noise, and resistance to vibration and impact. Programs to control machine operation are typically stored in battery-backed-up or non-volatile memory. A PLC is an example of a hard real time system since output results must be produced in response to input conditions within a limited time, otherwise unintended operation will result.
  - Supervisory control and data acquisition (SCADA) – generally refers to industrial control systems (ICS): computer systems that monitor and control industrial, infrastructure, or facility-based processes, as described below:* Industrial processes include those of manufacturing, production, power generation, fabrication, and refining, and may run in continuous, batch, repetitive, or discrete modes.
- Simulation § Engineering Technology simulation or Process simulation

== Social movements ==
Automation-related social movement – a movement that advocates semi- or fully automatic systems to provide for human needs globally. For example, automation of farming and food distribution throughout the world so that no one will go hungry. One goal is to automate all mundane labor, to free humans to engage in more creative activities (or less work).

- The Technocracy movement – social movement active from the Great Depression (1930s) to date that proposes replacing politicians and business people with scientists and engineers who have the technical expertise to manage the economy.
- The Zeitgeist Movement – movement advocating the replacement of the market economy with an economy in which all resources are equitably, commonly and sustainably shared.

== Automation in the future ==
- Android – a robot or synthetic organism designed to look and act like a human, and with a body having a flesh-like resemblance
- Technological singularity – the hypothetical future emergence of greater-than-human intelligence through technological means
- Semi-automation – using a centralized computer controller to orchestrate the activities of man and machine.

== Automation-related publications ==
- IEEE Spectrum – the flagship publication of the Institute of Electrical and Electronics Engineers (IEEE), explores the development, applications and implications of new technologies, and provides a forum for understanding, discussion and leadership in these areas.
- IEEE Transactions on Information Theory – peer-reviewed scientific journal published by the Institute of Electrical and Electronics Engineers (IEEE), focused on the study of information theory, the mathematics of communications, including computer communications, robotics communications, etc.
- IEEE Transactions on Control Systems Technology – published by the Institute of Electrical and Electronics Engineers (IEEE) Control Systems Society. Publishes papers, letters, tutorials, surveys, and perspectives on the current trends in control systems technology.
- IEEE Transactions on Computers – peer-reviewed scientific journal published by the IEEE Computer Society, containing articles and other contributions in the area of computer design by electrical and computer engineers.
- InTech published by International Society of Automation
- ISA Transactions published by Elsevier on behalf of the International Society of Automation

== Automation-related organizations ==
- Automation Federation
- International Society of Automation
- OPC Foundation
- The Venus Project

== Automation-related awards ==
- IEEE Robotics and Automation Award
- Industrial robot
- Autonomous research robot
- Domestic robot

== Persons influential in the field of automation ==
James S. Albus – a US government engineer and a prolific pioneering inventor of intelligent systems, automation and robotics. Also wrote extensively on the impact of automation on jobs, incomes, well-being and prosperity

== See also ==
- Outline of robotics
- Circuit theory
- Analog electronics
- Digital electronics – represent signals by discrete bands of analog levels, rather than by a continuous range.
- Power electronics – the application of solid-state electronics for the control and conversion of electric power.
- Electromagnetic field – (also EMF or EM field) is a physical field produced by moving electrically charged objects.
- Electrical measurements – are the methods, devices and calculations used to measure electrical quantities.
- Electric motor – an electromechanical device that converts electrical energy into mechanical energy.
- Control theory – a Multi-disciplinary Engineering|interdisciplinary branch of engineering and mathematics that deals with the behavior of dynamical systems.
- Microcomputer – a computer with a microprocessor as its central processing unit.
- Regulator
- Electronic speed control – or ESC is an electronic circuit with the purpose to vary an electric motor's speed, its direction and possibly also to act as a dynamic brake.
- Computer simulation – a computer model, or a computational model is a computer program, or network of computers, that attempts to simulate an abstract model of a particular system.
- Linear system – a mathematical model of a system based on the use of a linear operator.
- Electrical CAD – software packages that allow an electrical engineer to create and manage electrical schematics.
- Fuzzy control
- Servo drive – a special electronic amplifier used to power electric servomechanisms.
- Trade shows
- ASP-DAC
- DAC
- DATE
- ICCAD
