= Khaled B. Letaief =

Engineering academic

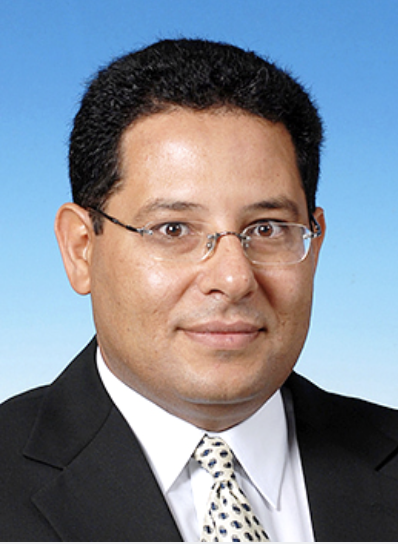
- Born: 1962 (age 63–64); Nabeul, Tunisia
- Education: Purdue University (BS with distinction, MS, PhD); University of Johannesburg (PhD Honoris Causa)
- Known for: Wireless communications
- Awards: IEEE Edwin H. Armstrong Achievement Award; IEEE Marconi Award in Wireless Communications; IEEE James Evans Avant Guard Award; IEEE Harold Sobol Award; IEEE Joseph LoCicero Publications Exemplary Award; Purdue University Distinguished Engineering Alumni Award; National President Award for Best Tunisian Researcher Living Abroad; 2024 Kuwait Prize
- Scientific career
- Workplaces: The Hong Kong University of Science and Technology; Hamad Bin Khalifa University; The University of Melbourne
- Website: ece.hkust.edu.hk/eekhaled

Khaled B. Letaief is an academic who is the New Bright Professor of Engineering and Chair Professor at the Department of Electronic and Computer Engineering of the Hong Kong University of Science and Technology (HKUST), Hong Kong. His research lies in the general area of wireless communications and networks, with research interests in AI and machine learning, mobile cloud and edge computing, tactile internet, and 6G systems. He is a fellow of the Institute of Electrical and Electronics Engineers (IEEE) since 2003, and an international member of the United States National Academy of Engineering (NAE) since 2021.

== Early life and education ==
Letaief was born in Nabeul, Tunisia in 1962. In 1981, he was among 200 high school graduates given scholarships by the Tunisian government for undergraduate studies in the USA. He received the BS degree in Electrical Engineering from Purdue University at West Lafayette, Indiana in December 1984. He then received the MS and PhD Degrees in Electrical Engineering from the same university, in August 1986, and May 1990, respectively. He has also received a PhD Honoris Causa from the University of Johannesburg, South Africa, in 2022.

== Career ==
Letaief started his academic career at the University of Melbourne in 1990, and was a lecturer/assistant professor there for three years. He joined the Hong Kong University of Science and Technology (HKUST) as an assistant professor in 1993, became an associate professor in 1996, a full professor in 2001, a chair professor in 2005, and since 2019, the New Bright Professor of Engineering.

While at HKUST, he has been Senior Advisor to the President, Acting Provost, Head of the Electronic and Computer Engineering department, Director of the Wireless IC Design Center, and Director of the Hong Kong Telecom Institute of Information Technology. He has also served as the Dean of Engineering.

From 2015 to 2018, Letaief joined Hamad Bin Khalifa University (HBKU) as Provost to help establish a research-intensive university in Qatar in partnership with Northwestern University, Carnegie Mellon University, Cornell, and Texas A&M.

Letaief served as Member of the IEEE Board of Directors, and has been IEEE Communications Society Vice-President for Conferences, Chair of IEEE Committee on Wireless Communications, elected member of IEEE Product Services and Publications Board, and IEEE Communications Society Vice-President for Technical Activities. He also served as President of the IEEE Communications Society (2018–19).

Letaief served as a consultant for Huawei, ASTRI, ZTE, Nortel, PricewaterhouseCoopers, and Motorola. He is the founding Editor-in-Chief of the IEEE Transactions on Wireless Communications and has served on the editorial board of the IEEE Journal on Selected Areas in Communications – Wireless Series. He has also been the General Chair of the IEEE Global Communications Conference (Globecom), IEEE Wireless Communications and Networking Conference (WCNC), and IEEE Vehicular Technology Conference (VTC), etc.

== National academies and fellowship ==
- Member, United States National Academy of Engineering (NAE)
- Member, Hong Kong Academy of Engineering Sciences (HKAES)
- Member, National Academy of Sciences, India (NASI)
- Member, Indian National Academy of Engineering (INAE)
- Fellow, Hong Kong Institution of Engineers (HKIE)
- Fellow, Institute of Electrical and Electronics Engineers (IEEE)

== Awards ==
- 2007 IEEE Joseph LoCicero Publications Exemplary Award
- 2009 IEEE Marconi Prize Award in Wireless Communications
- 2010 Purdue University Outstanding Electrical and Computer Engineer Award
- 2011 IEEE Wireless Communications Technical Committee Recognition Award
- 2011 IEEE Communications Society Harold Sobol Award
- 2016 IEEE Signal Processing Society Young Author Best Paper Award
- 2016 IEEE Marconi Prize Paper Award in Wireless Communications
- 2017 IEEE Technical Committee on Cognitive Networks Publication Award
- 2018 IEEE Signal Processing Society Young Author Best Paper Award
- 2019 Distinguished Research Excellence Award by HKUST School of Engineering (Highest research award and only one recipient/3 years is honored for his/her contributions)
- 2019 IEEE Communications Society and Information Theory Society Joint Paper Award
- 2021 IEEE Technical Committee on Cognitive Networks Recognition Award
- 2021 IEEE Communications Society Best Survey Paper Award
- 2022 IEEE Edwin Howard Armstrong Achievement Award
- 2024 Purdue University Distinguished Engineering Alumni Award
- 2024 IEEE James Evans Avant Guard Award
- 2024 Kuwait Prize in the field of Applied Sciences — Engineering Sciences

== Publications, patents, and grants ==
Letaief has co-authored several books and book chapters, including Stochastic Geometry Analysis of Multi-Antenna Wireless Networks. He has authored and co-authored over 700 journal and conference papers with over 62,250 citations and an h-index of 110 according to Google Scholar (as of August 2025). He also holds 15 inventions, including 11 US patents. In addition, he has launched and led several multi-university research projects, including the project manager and the principal investigator of the Area of Excellence Scheme of the Hong Kong Research Grant Council (a flagship project with a funding of HKD 87,304,000).
