= Igor L. Markov =

American computer scientist and engineer

Igor Leonidovich Markov
- Ігор Леонідович Марков
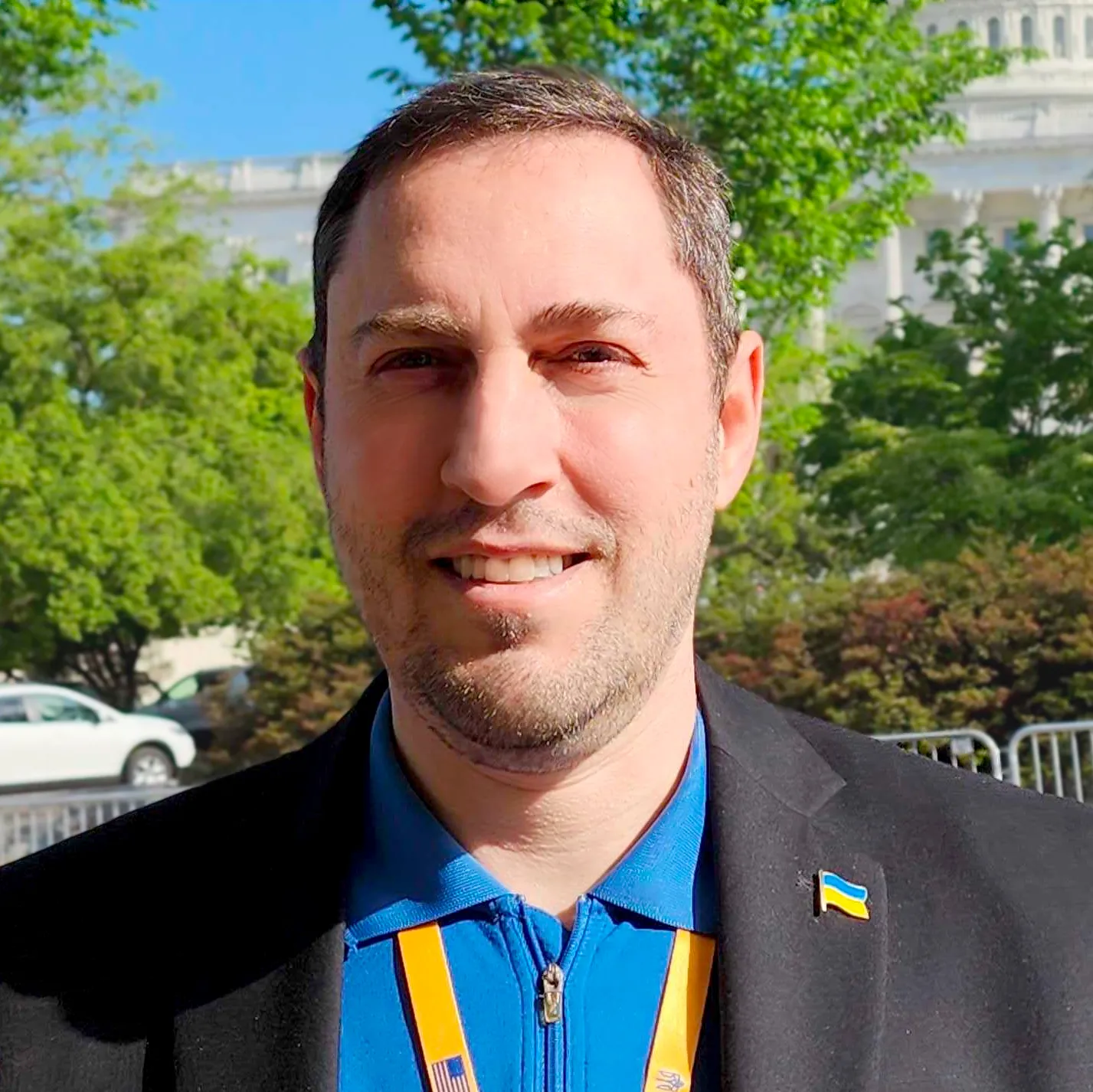
- Born: 31 March 1973 (age 53); Kiev, Ukrainian SSR, Soviet Union (now Kyiv, Ukraine)
- Alma mater: UCLA, Taras Shevchenko National University of Kyiv
- Scientific career
- Fields: Computer science, Electrical engineering, Optimization, Electronic design automation, Artificial intelligence, Quantum computing
- Workplaces: University of Michigan, Stanford University, Meta Platforms, Google
- Thesis: Top-Down Timing-Driven Placement with Direct Minimization of Maximal Signal Delay (2001)
- Doctoral advisor: Andrew B. Kahng
- Doctoral students: Smita Krishnaswamy
- Other notable students: Vivek Shende

Igor Leonidovich Markov (Note: Ukrainian: Ігор Леонідович Марков, romanized: Ihor Leonidovych Markov) (born in 1973) is an American professor, computer scientist and engineer. Markov is known for results in quantum computation, work on limits of computation, research on algorithms for optimizing integrated circuits and on electronic design automation, as well as artificial intelligence. Additionally, Markov is an American non-profit executive responsible for aid to Ukraine worth over a hundred million dollars.

Igor L. Markov has no known relation to the mathematician Andrey Markov.

== Career ==
Markov obtained an M.A. degree in mathematics and a Doctor of Philosophy degree in Computer Science from UCLA in 2001. From the early 2000s through 2018 he was a professor at University of Michigan, where he supervised doctoral dissertations and degrees of 12 students in Electrical engineering and Computer science. He worked as a principal engineer at Synopsys during a sabbatical leave. In 2013-2014 he was a visiting professor at Stanford University. Markov worked at Google on Search and Information Retrieval, and at Meta on Machine Learning platforms. As of 2024, he works at Synopsys.

Markov is a member of the Board of Directors of Nova Ukraine, a California 501(c)(3) charity organization that provides humanitarian aid in Ukraine. At Nova Ukraine, Markov leads government and media relations, as well as advocacy efforts. Markov curated publicity efforts, established and curated large medical and evacuation projects, and contributed to fundraising.

Markov is a member of the Board of Directors of the American Coalition for Ukraine, an umbrella organization that coordinates one hundred US-based nonprofits concerned about events in Ukraine.

== Awards and distinctions ==
The ACM Special Interest Group on Design Automation honored Markov with an Outstanding New Faculty Award in 2004.

Markov was the 2009 recipient of IEEE CEDA Ernest S. Kuh Early Career Award "for outstanding contributions to algorithms, methodologies and software for the physical design of integrated circuits." Markov became ACM Distinguished Scientist in 2011. In 2013 he was named an IEEE fellow "for contributions to optimization methods in electronic design automation".

=== Award-winning publications ===
Markov's peer-reviewed scholarly work was recognized with five best-paper awards, including four at major conferences and a journal in the field of electronic design automation, and one in theoretical computer science:

- The 2003 IEEE Transactions on Computer-Aided Design of Integrated Circuits and Systems Donald O. Pederson Best Paper Award, shared with Vivek Shende and John P. Hayes for work on reversible logic circuits.
- The 2004 best-paper award at the Design Automation and Test in Europe (DATE) conference, shared with Smita Krishnaswamy, George F. Viamontes, and John P. Hayes for work on circuit reliability evaluation with probabilistic transfer matrices. Full journal version of this work was published four years later.
- The 2008 best-paper award at the International Symposium on Physical Design (ISPD), shared with Stephen Plaza and Valeria Bertacco, for work on physical synthesis.
- The 2010 best-paper award at the International Conference on Computer-Aided Design (ICCAD) for work on circuit placement. The full journal version of this work was published two years later.
- The best-paper award at the 2012 Alan Turing Centenary Conference in Manchester, UK, shared with Karem A. Sakallah for work on graph automorphism and canonical labeling.

== Books and other publications ==
Markov co-authored over 200 peer-reviewed publications in journals and archival conference proceedings, and Google Scholar reported over 19,000 citations of his publications as of October 2023.

In a 2014 Nature article, Markov surveyed known limits to computation, pointing out that many of them are fairly lose and do not restrict near-term technologies. When practical technologies encounter serious limits, understanding these limits can lead to workarounds. More often, what is practically achievable depends on technology-specific engineering limitations.

In 2024, Markov published a paper in Communications of the ACM critical of a prior Nature publication on chip design.

Markov co-edited the two-volume Electronic Design Automation handbook published in second edition by Taylor & Francis in 2016. He also co-authored five scholarly books published by Springer, among them are two textbooks:

- a 2009 book on simulation of quantum circuits,
- a 2011 book on physical design of integrated circuits for university courses with exercises, revised in 2022 as a second edition.

Markov's other books cover uncertainty in logic circuits, dealing with functional design errors in digital circuits, and physical synthesis of integrated circuits.

== Key technical contributions ==
=== Quantum computing ===
Markov’s contributions include results on quantum circuit synthesis (creating circuits from specifications) and simulation of quantum circuits on conventional computers (obtaining the output of a quantum computer without a quantum computer).

- An algorithm for the synthesis of linear reversible circuits with at most $O(n^2/\log n)$ CNOT gates (asymptotically optimal) that was extended by Scott Aaronson and Daniel Gottesman to perform optimal synthesis of Clifford circuits, with applications to quantum error correction.
- Optimal synthesis of a two-qubit unitary that uses the minimal number of CNOT gates
- Asymptotically optimal synthesis of an $n$-qubit quantum circuit that (a) implements a given unitary matrix using no more than$(23/48)\times 4^n - (3/2) \times 2^n + 4/3$ CNOT gates (less than a factor of two away from the theoretical lower bound) and (b) induces an initial quantum state using no more than $2^{n+1} - 2n$ CNOT gates (less than a factor of four away from the theoretical lower bound). IBM Qiskit uses Markov's circuit synthesis algorithm.
- Efficient simulation of quantum circuits with low tree-width using tensor-network contraction. Follow-up works extended this technique with approximations, which allowed them to simulate quantum Fourier transform in poly time. Markov's work was used in an essential way in the first proof (by Dorit Aharonov et al.) that quantum Fourier transform can be classically simulated.

=== Physical design of integrated circuits ===
Markov's Capo placer provided a baseline for comparisons used in the placement literature. The placer was commercialized and used to design industry chips. Markov's contributions include algorithms, methodologies and software for

- Circuit partitioning: high-performance heuristic optimizations for hypergraph partitioning
- Placement: algorithms for finding $(x,y)$ locations of circuit components that optimize interconnects between those components
- Floorplanning: algorithms and methodologies for chip planning in terms of locations of large components
- Routing: algorithms based on Lagrangian relaxation to construct global wire routs on a multilayer grid structure
- Physical synthesis: algorithms and methodologies for altering logic circuits to admit layouts with shorter interconnects or lower latency

=== Machine learning ===
Markov led the development of an end-to-end AI platform called Looper, which supports the full machine learning lifecycle from model training, deployment, and inference all the way to evaluation and tuning of products. Looper provides easy-to-use APIs for optimization, personalization, and feedback collection.

== Activity on social media ==
Markov was awarded a Top Writer status on Quora in 2018, 2017, 2016, 2015 and 2014, he has over 80,000 followers. His contributions were republished by Huffington Post, Slate, and Forbes.

Markov is a moderator for the cs.ET (Emerging Technologies in Computing and Communications) subject area on arXiv.
