= Janet Olson =

Silicon Valley technology executive

Janet Olson is a Silicon Valley technology executive and leading contributor to the field of semiconductor Electronic Design Automation (EDA). For over 30 years, she was Vice President of Engineering at the world's top two semiconductor EDA companies - first Synopsys and then Cadence Design Systems. She holds 9 U.S. patents.

With a focus on logic synthesis, Olson published numerous papers and presented at international EDA conferences, such as the International Symposium on Physical Design, the International Conference on Computer-Aided Design, and Design Automation and Test in Europe.

She is on the Board of Equal Opportunity Schools, and chairs its Technology Governance Committee.

Olson obtained her BS in electrical engineering and computer engineering at Carnegie Mellon University and MS in electrical engineering from Stanford University.

== Awards ==
- Design Automation Conference Marie R. Pistilli Women in Engineering Achievement Award to honor outstanding EDA achievements, 2017
- YWCA Tribute to Women Award, 2015
