= Marculescu =

Marculescu, Mărculescu is a Romanian surname. Notable people with the surname include:

- Cornel Mărculescu, Romanian water polo player
- Diana Marculescu, American engineer
- Radu Marculescu, American engineer
- Yolanda Marculescu (1923–1992), Romanian opera singer
