= Vivek Shende =

American mathematician

- Education: Princeton University
- Scientific career
- Fields: Mathematics, Quantum Computing
- Workplaces: University of California Berkeley, University of Southern Denmark, MIT
- Thesis: Hilbert schemes of points on integral plane curves (2011)
- Doctoral advisor: Rahul Pandharipande

Vivek Vijay Shende is an American mathematician known for his work on algebraic geometry, symplectic geometry and quantum computing. He is a professor of Quantum Mathematics at Syddansk Universitet while on leave from University of California Berkeley.

== Doctoral studies and early career ==
Shende defended his Ph.D. dissertation "Hilbert schemes of points on integral plane curves" at Princeton University in 2011 under the supervision of Rahul Pandharipande. From 2011 to 2013, he was a Simons Postdoctoral Fellow at MIT mentored by Paul Seidel. Shende joined Berkeley as an assistant professor in 2013 and became an associate professor in 2019. He supervised at least four doctoral degrees at Berkeley.

== Awards and accomplishments ==
In 2021, after moving to Denmark, Shende received sizable grants intended to support the creation of a new research group. The Danish National Research Foundation awarded Shende its DNRF Chair. The Villum Foundation funded Shende's research in mathematical aspects of String theory through the Villum Investigator program. This is one of the largest and most prestigious grants for individual researchers in Denmark.

As a Berkeley professor, Shende received the National Science Foundation CAREER Award in 2017 and a Sloan Research Fellowship in Mathematics in 2015.

In 2010, Shende proved, together with Martijn Kool and Richard Thomas, the Göttsche conjecture on the universality of formulas counting nodal curves on surfaces, a problem in algebraic geometry whose history stretches back more than a century.

During his undergraduate studies at the University of Michigan, he performed computer science research with Igor L. Markov and John P. Hayes. Shende shared in 2004 the IEEE Donald O. Pederson Award in Solid-State Circuits as the lead author of the work on synthesis of reversible logic circuits. This paper proved the existence of reversible circuits that implement certain permutations and developed algorithms for finding such circuits. Shende was also the lead author of the work on synthesis of quantum circuits that developed the quantum Shannon decomposition and algorithms for finding asymptotically optimal quantum circuits that implement a given $n$-qubit unitary matrix, as well as quantum circuits that construct a given $n$-qubit quantum state. Shende obtained formulas and algorithms for implementing smallest possible quantum circuits for 2-qubit unitary matrices. For the 3-qubit Toffoli gate, he proved that six CNOT gates are necessary in a circuit that implements it, showing that the widely used six-CNOT decomposition is optimal. These publications are highly cited (per Google Scholar) and their results laid the foundation of compilers for quantum computers.

== Mathematics education ==
Shende taught college-level Calculus, Discrete Mathematics as well as Linear Algebra and Differential Equations courses at Berkeley. In 2021 he cosigned, along with many professional mathematicians, an open letter to Governor Gavin Newsom and other California officials asking to replace the proposed new California Math curriculum framework. The framework was adopted in 2023 despite these objections.
