= Alexander Meystel =

Electrical engineer and researcher in intelligent control systems and robotics

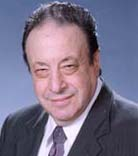
- Born: February 25, 1935; Leningrad (prior to 1991), Soviet Union
- Died: November 28, 2010 (aged 75)
- Education: Experimental Scientific Research Institute for Metal-cutting Machine Tools (PhD)
- Occupation: Electrical Engineer

Alexander M. Meystel (February 25, 1935 – November 28, 2010) was an electrical engineer, professor, and researcher specializing in intelligent control systems, robotics, and machine intelligence.

== Early life and education ==
Meystel was born in Leningrad, Soviet Union, (now Saint Petersburg, Russia) on February 25, 1935. During World War II, he was evacuated the Soviet Union and later grew up in Odessa. In 1965, He received his PhD from the Experimental Scientific Research Institute for Metal-cutting Machine Tools (ENIMS) in Moscow, focusing on transient processes in induction motors.

== Career ==
Meystel was a Senior Scientist at ENIMS. After emigrating to the United States in 1978, he worked for companies including Hyper-Loop and Gould before joining the University of Florida as a professor in 1980. In 1984, he joined Drexel University's Electrical and Computer Engineering department, where he remained until retiring in 2005.

Meystel spent 17 years designing and creating machines with numerical control.

Meystel's work focused on multiresolutional and hierarchical control systems, intelligent control, and semiotics applied to machine intelligence and text processing. He contributed to autonomous robotics research and the Meaning-Oriented Analysis of Texts (MOATS) system.

His 1993 work on “Robot Learning to Walk: An Architectural Problem for Intelligent Controllers” has been cited by 35 patents.

Meystel served as chair and organizer of multiple IEEE conferences and special sessions focused on intelligent control and robotics. He collaborated with the National Institute of Standards and Technology's Intelligent Systems Division.

== Selected IEEE publications ==
- Albus, J. S., Lacaze, A., Meystel, A., "Autonomous Learning via Nested Clustering," in 'Proceedings of the 1995 34th IEEE Conference on Decision and Control ', 1995.
- Meystel, A., "Multiscale Models and Controllers," in 'Proceedings of the IEEE Symposium on Computer-Aided Control Systems Design ', 1994.
- Meystel, A., Filipovic, P., "Hierarchical Wavelet Controller," in '1993 American Control Conference ', 1993.
- Albus, J. S., Meystel, A., Uzzaman, S., "Nested Motion Planning for an Autonomous Robot," in 'Proceedings of the First IEEE Regional Conference on Aerospace Control Systems ', 1993.
- Meystel, A., Nisenzon, Y., Nawathe, R., "Fuzzy Variable Structure Controller for Chattering Reduction," in 'Proceedings of the First IEEE Regional Conference on Aerospace Control Systems ', 1993.
- Filipovic, P., Meystel, A., "Hierarchical Feedback Control System," in 'Proceedings of the 32nd IEEE Conference on Decision and Control ', 1993.
- Meystel, A., Nisenzon, Y., Nawathe, R., "Merger of Rule Based and Variable Structure Controller," in 'Proceedings of the IEEE International Conference on Control and Applications ', 1993.
- Maximov, Y., Meystel, A., "Optimum Architectures for Multiresolutional Control," in 'Proceedings of the First IEEE Regional Conference on Aerospace Control Systems ', 1993.

== Media coverage and recognition ==
Meystel's research was covered in several independent newspaper articles in the 1980s, including:

- "Researcher Gives Robot An Intuition Trait For Thought," 'The Evening Independent ', September 27, 1984.
- "University Of Florida Professor Works To Give Robots," 'Ocala Star-Banner ', April 10, 1983.
- "Future Robots To Make Choices," 'Gainesville Sun ', April 12, 1983.
- "Professor Teaches Robots Intuition," 'Lakeland Ledger ', September 25, 1984.
