= Ahmed Tewfik =

Egyptian American engineer

Ahmed H. Tewfik
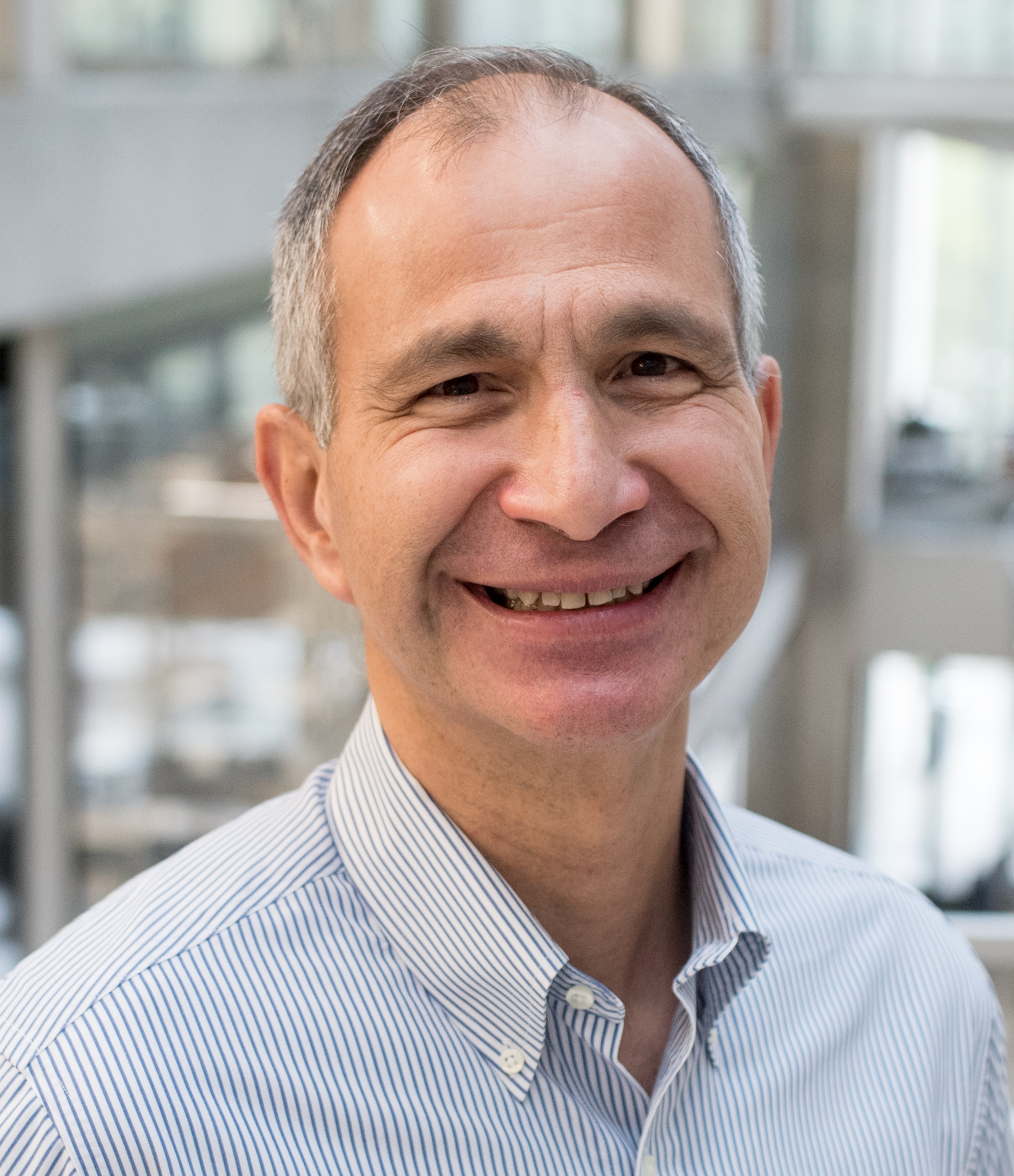

IEEE Signal Processing Society President
- Incumbent
- Assumed office 2020
- Preceded by: Ali H. Sayed

Chair of the Department of Electrical and Computer Engineering at the Cockrell School of Engineering at the University of Texas at Austin
- In office 2010–2019
- Preceded by: Anthony Ambler
- Succeeded by: Diana Marculescu

Personal details
- Born: Cairo, Egypt
- Education: Cairo University; Massachusetts Institute of Technology
- Profession: Electrical Engineer, Academic
- Website: www.ece.utexas.edu/people/faculty/ahmed-tewfik

Ahmed H. Tewfik is an Egyptian-American electrical engineer, professor and college administrator who currently serves as the IEEE Signal Processing Society President. He also holds the Cockrell Family Chair in Engineering #1 at UT Austin. He served as the former chair of the Department of Electrical and Computer Engineering at the Cockrell School of Engineering at the University of Texas at Austin from 2010 to 2019. For his research and contributions to the field of Signal Processing he was elected as an IEEE Fellow in 1996, received the IEEE Third Millennium Award in 2000, and awarded the 2017 IEEE Signal Processing Society Technical Achievement Award.

== Early life and career ==
Tewfik spent his childhood in Egypt and Lebanon. He received his B.S.E.E. from Cairo University in 1982 and both a M.S.E.E. in 1984 and Sc.D. in 1987 from the Massachusetts Institute of Technology. Alan S. Willsky and Bernard Levy were his dissertation advisers.

After briefly working at Alphatech, he began his educational career as an assistant professor in the Department of Electrical and Computer Engineering at the University of Minnesota in 1987. He became the endowed E. F. Johnson professor of Electronic Communications in 1993. From August 1997 to August 2001 he took a partial leave of absence to co-found and become president and CEO of Cognicity, Inc., an entertainment marketing software tools publisher.

He received the NSF Research Initiation Award in 1990 and the Taylor Faculty Development Award from the Taylor Foundation in 1992. He was elected an IEEE Fellow in 1996 and was a distinguished lecturer of the IEEE Signal Processing Society from 1997 to 1999. For his research and contributions to the field of Signal Processing he was awarded the IEEE Third Millennium Award in 2000 and the IEEE Signal Processing Society Technical Achievement Award in 2017.

Tewfik has been extremely active in the IEEE Signal Processing Society and currently serves as president. Previously he served on the Board of Governors from 2006 to 2008 and as the 2010–2012 SPS Vice President-Technical Directions. He was also the founding Editor-in-Chief of the IEEE Signal Processing Letters publication serving in the role from 1993 to 1997.

In 2010, he was selected to succeed Anthony Ambler as chair of the Department of Electrical and Computer Engineering at the Cockrell School of Engineering at the University of Texas at Austin. In 2019, he was succeeded as chair by Diana Marculescu.

== Chair of Electrical and Computer Engineering at UT Austin ==
Under Tewfik's tenure the Department of Electrical and Computer Engineering moved up in the U.S. News & World Report Rankings to become consistently ranked in the top ten programs nationally. He launched several new programs within the ECE department including an integrated bachelors / masters program and an online executive masters program. He also launched the department's first set of MOOC courses (massive open online courses).

One of Tewfik's key priorities during his tenure was to expand diversity at the Department of Electrical and Computer Engineering (ECE). Under his leadership, the percentage of female students in the entering class grew from less than 13.7% in the fall of 2011 to over 22% by the fall of 2016. He also tripled the number of female faculty members in the department. In parallel, he implemented a number of student support programs that emphasize hands-on experience to drive four year graduation rates from 16% to 41% for the underrepresented student minority population. Overall first-year student retention rates increased from 78% in 2011 to 92% in 2015 during his tenure.
