= Eta Kappa Nu =

Electrical engineering honor society

- ΗΚΝ
- Founded: October 28, 1904; 121 years ago University of Illinois at Urbana-Champaign
- Type: Honor
- Affiliation: Independent
- Former affiliation: ACHS
- Status: Active
- Emphasis: Electrical engineering, computer engineering and computer science
- Scope: International
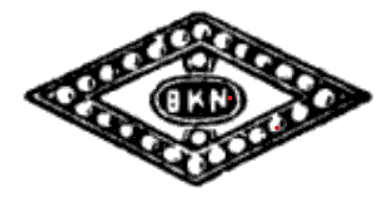
- Member badge
- Colors: Navy blue, Scarlet
- Symbol: Wheatstone bridge
- Publication: The Bridge
- Chapters: Over 260
- Members: 200,000+ lifetime
- Headquarters: 445 Hoes Lane; Piscataway, New Jersey 08554; United States
- Website: hkn.ieee.org

Eta Kappa Nu (ΗΚΝ) or IEEE-HKN is the international honor society of the Institute of Electrical and Electronics Engineers (IEEE). Joining HKN is by invitation only. Membership is a lifelong designation for individuals who have distinguished themselves as students or as professionals in electrical engineering, computer engineering, computer science, and other fields of IEEE interest.

Eta Kappa Nu was founded in 1904 as an independent honor society for electrical engineering. It has expanded its scope through the years and it became an organizational unit within IEEE in 2010. Over 260 collegiate chapters have been chartered worldwide and more than 200,000 members have been elected to membership.

== History ==
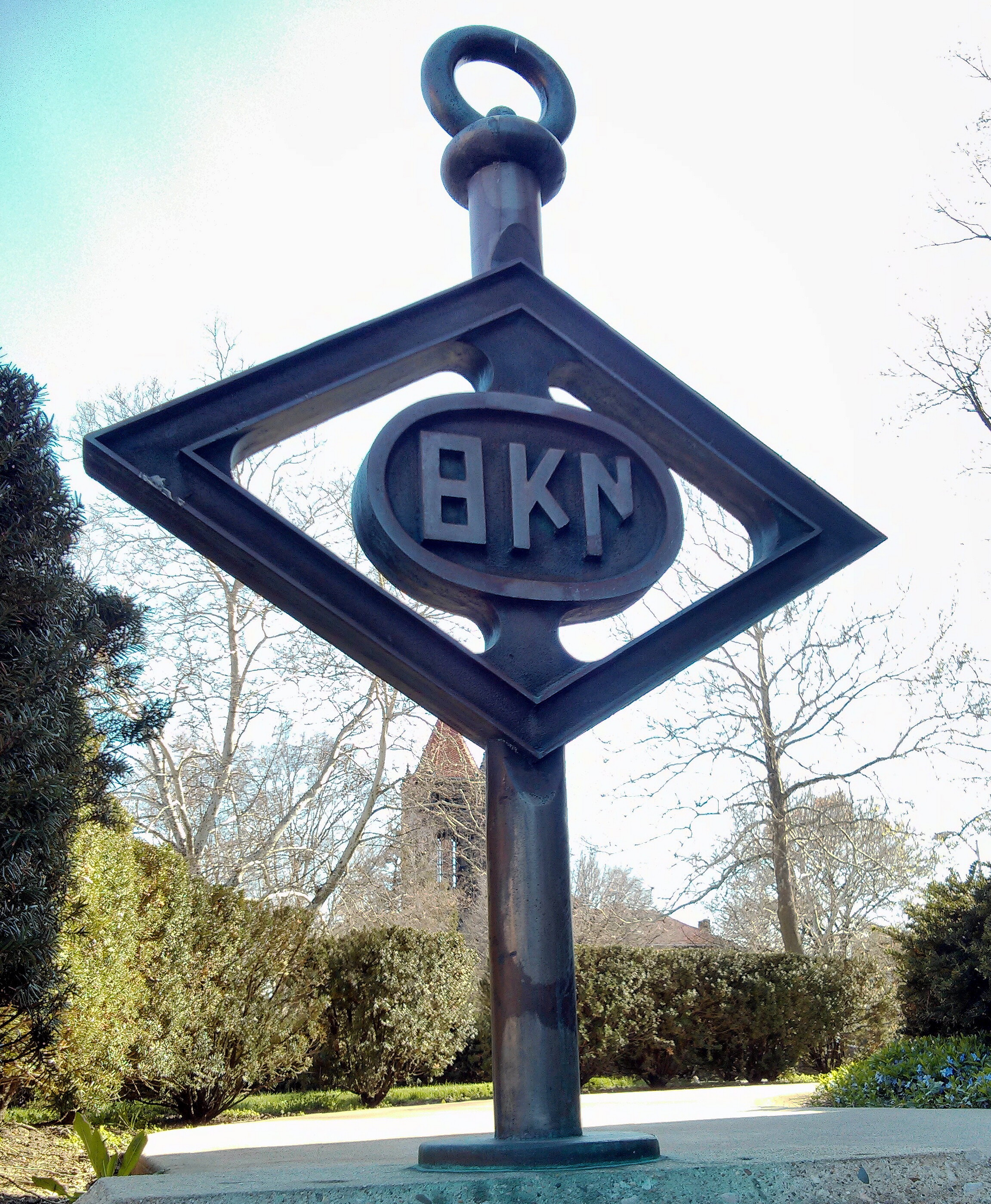
Many HKN chapters have campus visibility through monuments such as this Bridge at the University of Illinois at Urbana-Champaign.

Eta Kappa Nu was founded on October 28, 1904 as the national honor society for electrical engineering students at the University of Illinois at Urbana-Champaign. Maurice L. Carr and nine other undergraduates formed the first chapter and developed a national structure. Their vision for the honor association combined collegiate engagement with a professional community to aid student and alumni members and to support the general profession. Character and attitude were designated along with scholarship as the three ideals to be recognized and promoted through membership and activity. Hence, HKN is concerned with more than simply scholarship and the collegiate experience.

The first century of Eta Kappa Nu began with two of the founders, Maurice L. Carr and Edmund B. Wheeler, serving as the first and second national presidents, respectively. The next chapters were organized at Purdue University, Ohio State University, and Illinois Institute of Technology. By the centennial in 2004, more than 200 student chapters as well as several alumni chapters had been chartered. These chapters have sustained records of local service and engagement activities. The national organization developed prominent awards for outstanding chapters, students, teachers, young professionals, and service in electrical engineering. The scope expanded to both electrical and computer engineering in 2000. ΗΚΝ also created a membership path for professionals and an Eminent Member recognition for career accomplishments.

The second century of Eta Kappa Nu has a continued emphasis on the original vision, but the program and structure have been modified. Its signature activities have been revised to include special attention to service and student conferences. It has formalized a relationship within IEEE as an organizational unit in which ΗΚΝ is now IEEE-HKN and it is governed by a Board of Governors that are elected by the chapters. This merger became effective on 1 September 2010. As a result of the merger, chapters are being chartered internationally and membership eligibility is expanded to all IEEE fields of interest. The first chapters outside the U.S. were chartered in 2012 at the University of Hong Kong and Dalhousie University (Canada). The headquarters was moved to IEEE in Piscataway, NJ where the office is administered by the IEEE-HKN Director and staff. IEEE-HKN has close ties with the Electrical and Computer Engineering Department Heads Association (ECEDHA).

An important repository of HKN/IEEE-HKN history is the Engineering and Technology History Wiki (ETHW).

== Symbols ==
Eta Kappa Nu's name is based on the Greek word for amber "elektron" from which the English words "electron", "electricity", and "electronic" are derived. (Amber is a material that exhibits electrostatic properties when rubbed.) In Greek, the word is ΗΛΕΚΤΡΟΝ or ήλεκτρον. The first, fourth, and last letters form the society name of Eta Kappa Nu, which abbreviates to ΗΚΝ.

The emblem is a stylized representation of a Wheatstone bridge. This circuit is used to determine an unknown resistance from three known resistances. A membership analogy is made in which career success is determined when a balance of scholarship, character, and attitude is achieved. These three ideals are the basis for member eligibility.

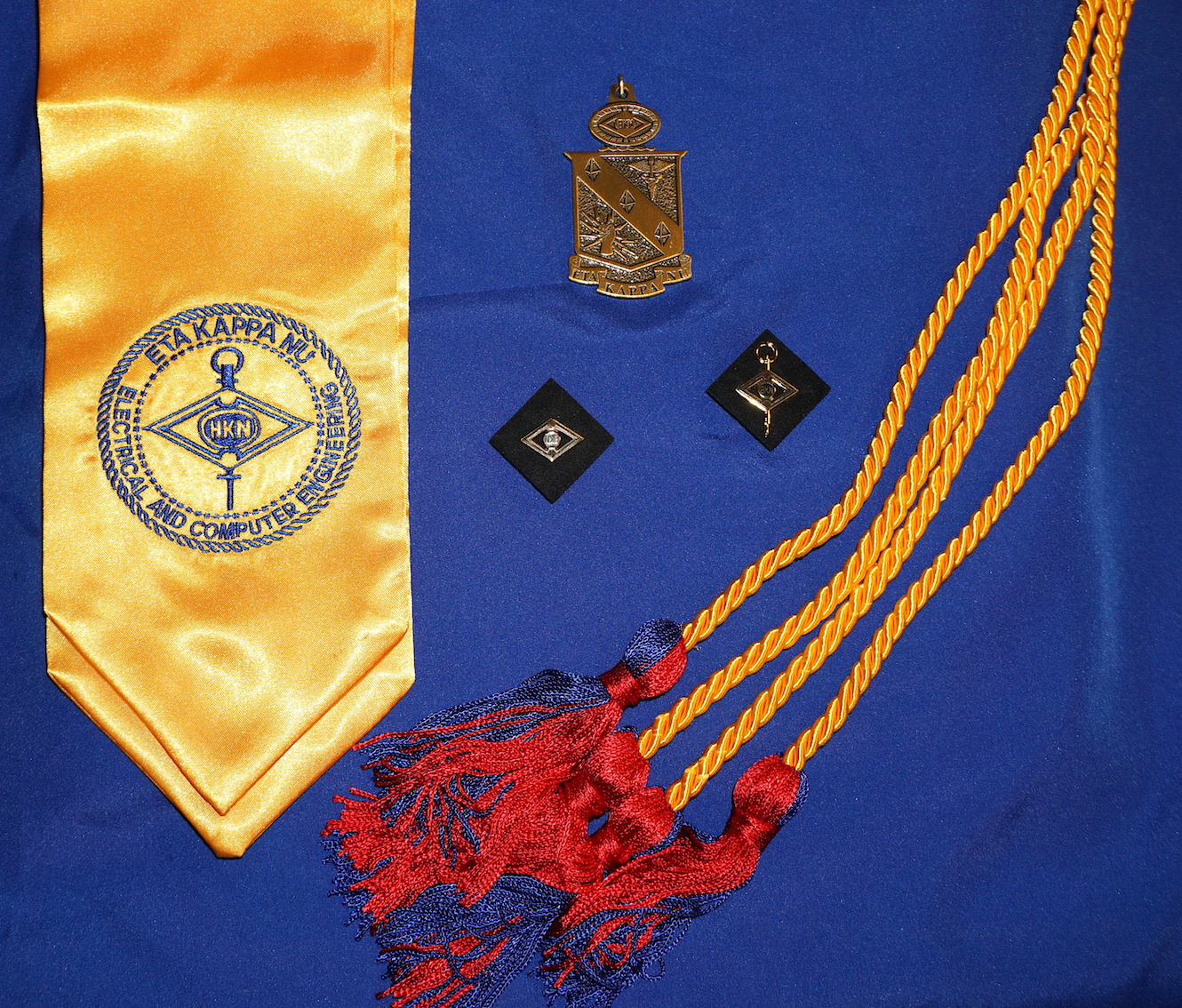
Eta Kappa Nu stole, pins, and honor cords for inductions, graduations, and membership.

Its shield dates from 1927 and symbolizes several aspects of ΗΚΝ history. The three ideals are represented prominently by the three cubes of magnetite in the diagonal band and are also represented in the emblem atop the shield. (Early forms of the Greek letters are used in the center of this version.) The caduceus in the honor point of the shield is a memorial to founder Maurice L. Carr who favored this symbol. The hand of Jupiter stands for the first chapter Alpha and the ten lightning bolts refer to the original ten founding members. The shield incorporates the ΗΚΝ colors, navy blue to represent loyalty and scarlet to represent zeal. Student members will often wear honor cords in these colors at their graduation. Members are also encouraged to wear pins of either the emblem or the shield.

A ceremony is the last step in members' entry into ΗΚΝ. An induction ritual reviews the history, the three ideals, and the symbols as described here. In addition, the induction officials will speak as avatars, or in the voice, of selected historical individuals. This ΗΚΝ review and the use of avatars reflect an intention to honor and remember the contributions of the past.

== Activities ==
The corporate IEEE-HKN supports the chapters and the profession with a variety of signature activities. An annual Founders Day promotion during October encourages chapters to celebrate ΗΚΝ and to engage in service in their local community in recognition of ΗΚΝ's founding. An annual student conference addresses networking, leadership, and professional development objectives. A prominent awards program includes six award categories to promote educational and career excellence. An online magazine, The Bridge, is an archival publication for students, alumni members, and others in the profession and industry.

Collegiate chapter activities, including the member election process, are organized around the recognition of academic accomplishment, the promotion of ethical behavior and volunteer service, and the development of leadership and collaborative skills. These chapters recognize high scholarship through membership and foster a culture of service and volunteerism within their host departments. They are noted for student-led engagement with peers, faculty, and industry through tutoring, maker-space management, networking events, etc.

== Recognitions and awards ==
IEEE-Eta Kappa Nu membership is an honor society recognition and is earned through qualification, election, and induction. Any student chapter may conduct the membership process for undergraduates, graduate students, and professional members. Minimum scholastic or professional qualifications are defined. However, a chapter may set higher scholastic or career qualifications and will evaluate the character and attitude qualifications locally. An alumni chapter or the Board of Governors may conduct a membership process for professional members. During the induction ceremony, new members commit themselves to the ideals of ΗΚΝ.

An Eminent Member category was approved as the highest membership grade in 1941 and the first recognitions were in 1950. This grade is reserved for "those individuals, who by their technical attainments and contributions to society, have shown themselves to be outstanding leaders in an IEEE-designed field of interest, and great benefactors to society." Individuals must be recognized during their lifetimes for the Eminent Member category; deceased individuals may be recognized as Honorary Eminent Members. Only 144 Eminent Members and 10 Honorary Eminent Members have been recognized by the ΗΚΝ.

IEEE-HKN has an annual awards program to honor accomplishments related to the Eta Kappa Nu vision. The initial award category was created in 1932 for outstanding chapter activities. Several awards are named for important HKN volunteers. There are six award categories:

- Outstanding Chapter Award
- Alton B. Zerby and Carl T. Koerner Outstanding Student Award
- C. Holmes MacDonald Outstanding Teaching Award
- Outstanding Young Professional Award
- Distinguished Service Award
- Asad M. Madni Outstanding Technical Achievement and Excellence Award.

== Publications ==
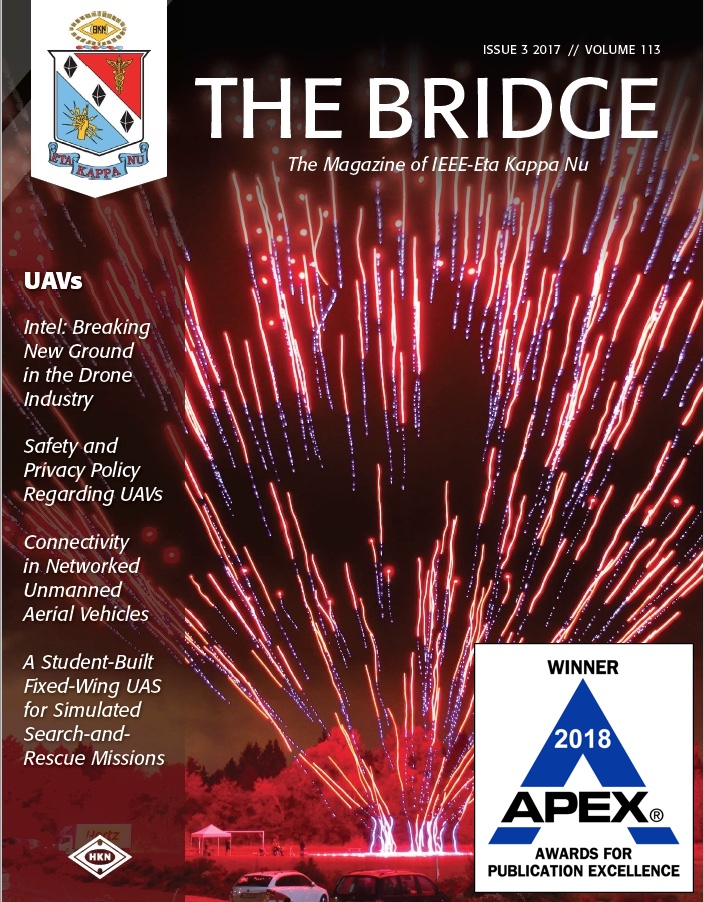
The Bridge magazine 113(3), 2017. This cover with an image of Intel's UAV light-display show won a 2018 APEX Award.

The Bridge magazine is an open-access publication of IEEE and is the archival, flagship publication of IEEE-Eta Kappa Nu. Features relate to the technical, historical, and professional interests of the membership, and other content deals with the activities of the organization. Chapters, student members, and alumni are welcome to submit potential content. Alton B. Zerby, Executive Secretary 1934–1958, wrote that the magazine started “as a vehicle of communication between students and alumni.” It continues to connect students and alumni, as well as to promote the activities and recognition programs of IEEE-HKN and to highlight the development of technology and the profession. The magazine is managed by volunteers, an Editor-in-Chief, and an editorial board (a standing committee of IEEE-HKN), with assistance from the IEEE-HKN Director and other staff.

The history of the magazine dates back to the first publication of Eta Kappa Nu which was a short booklet entitled The Electric Field. This name continued until 1908. The name of The Eta Kappa Nu Yearbook was used briefly. The first use of The Bridge as the publication name occurred in 1910. The volume label was added later and the volume count dates to the publication year of 1905. The number of issues per year has varied from one to four. Originally a print publication, the magazine became electronic-only after the HKN merger with IEEE in 2010. Recent issues have won numerous international awards for excellence.

== Membership ==
Most members are inducted as students, but distinguished professionals may be inducted as well. The guiding ideals for membership eligibility of scholarship, character, and attitude have remained unchanged since the early years. Student members join their collegiate chapter of IEEE-HKN for reasons including:

- Formal recognition of academic accomplishment
- Interaction with faculty and successful students
- Opportunities for leadership experience
- Organized service projects and service learning
- Opportunities for professional development
- Lifelong professional community within IEEE

== Chapters ==
IEEE-Eta Kappa Nu collegiate chapters are present at educational institutions of higher learning across the world. These chapters are designated by a Greek letter or letters starting with the first chapter Alpha at the University of Illinois. The second chapter, Beta at Purdue University, was organized and began inducting members in 1906; however, the chapter was not officially approved by the Purdue University administration until 1913. The chapter with the Eta designation is administered by the IEEE-HKN Board of Governors for at-large inductions.

== See also ==
- List of engineering societies
- Professional fraternities and sororities
