= ICDE =

ICDE may refer to:

- International Council for Open and Distance Education, an international educational organization headquartered in Norway
- IEEE International Conference on Data Engineering (IEE ICDE), a computer science conference included in the list of IEEE conferences
