= Smita Krishnaswamy =

American scientist

- Education: University of Michigan
- Scientific career
- Fields: Computer Science, Genetics, Machine Learning, Electronic Design Automation
- Workplaces: IBM, Yale University
- Thesis: Design, Analysis and Test of Logic Circuits under Uncertainty (2008)
- Doctoral advisor: Igor L. Markov, John P. Hayes

Smita Krishnaswamy is an American scientist and associate professor in genetics and computer science at Yale University. She specializes in the development of machine learning techniques to analyze high-dimensional high-throughput biomedical data with applications in immunology, immunotherapy, cancer, neuroscience, developmental biology and health outcomes. She organized the Open Problems in Single-Cell Biology effort with the Chan Zuckerberg Initiative and remains a scientific advisor for the project.

== Education and early career ==
Krishnaswamy obtained her Ph.D. in computer science and engineering from University of Michigan in 2008. She then joined IBM's T.J. Watson Research Center as a scientist in the systems division, where she researched formal methods for automated error detection. Her Deltasyn algorithm was utilized in IBM System p and IBM System z high-performance server chips.

Krishnaswamy switched her research efforts to biology and completed postdoctoral training in 2015 at Columbia University in the Department of Systems Biology, where she focused on learning computational models of cellular signaling from single-cell mass cytometry data.

== Awards and honors ==
In 2022, Krishnaswamy's research, teaching and community work were honored by a FASEB Excellence in Science Award (Early-Career Investigator Award) from the Federation of American Societies for Experimental Biology funded by Eli Lilly and Company.

In 2009, Krishnaswamy was the recipient of the European Design Automation Association's Outstanding Dissertation Award in the category "new directions in circuit and system test".

In 2005, Krishnaswamy received a best-paper award from the Design Automation and Test in Europe conference for the paper of which she was the lead author.

== Publications ==
Krishnaswamy co-authored a book published by Springer Verlag and over 50 peer-reviewed publications, including journal papers in Nature Biotechnology, Nature Protocols, Nature Methods Science, Cell and conference papers in International Conference on Machine Learning.
