= Payam Heydari =

Iranian-American Professor

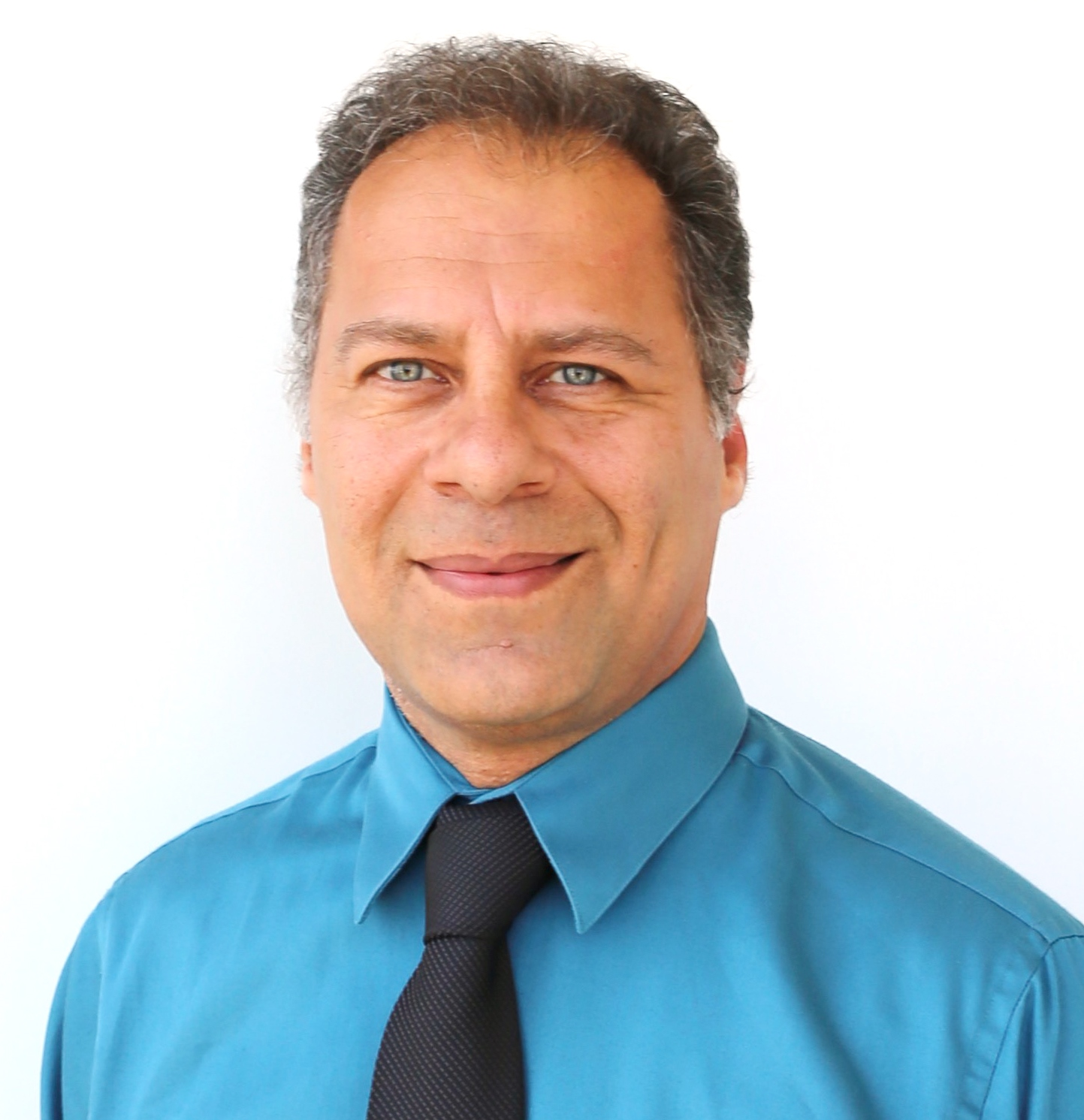
- Education: University of Southern California
- Known for: Radio-frequency (RF) and millimeter-wave integrated circuits
- Awards: Fellow of the American Association for the Advancement of Science (AAAS); Fellow of National Academy of Inventors; IEEE MTT-S Distinguished Educator Award; IEEE Solid-State Circuits Society Innovative Education Award; IEEE Fellow; IEEE Darlington Award; IEEE Guillemin-Cauer Award
- Scientific career
- Fields: Electrical Engineering
- Workplaces: University of California, Irvine
- Doctoral advisor: Masoud Pedram

Payam Heydari (Persian: پيام حيدرى) was born in the Imperial State of Iran and is now an Iranian-American Professor who is noted for his contributions to the field of radio-frequency and millimeter-wave integrated circuits.

== Education ==
Heydari attended Sharif University of Technology in Tehran and received his B.S. and M.S. degrees in Electrical Engineering in 1992 and 1995, respectively. He obtained his Ph.D. degree from the University of Southern California in 2001. In 1997, he worked at Bell-labs, Lucent Technologies on noise analysis in high-speed CMOS integrated circuits fields. In 1998, he worked at IBM T. J. Watson Research Center on gradient-based optimization and sensitivity analysis of custom analog/RF ICs.

== Career ==
Heydari is a Chancellor's Professor at the University of California, Irvine. His research in the design of terahertz and millimeter-wave integrated circuits in silicon resulted in the world's first CMOS fundamental frequency transceiver operating at 210 GHz and the first terahertz closed-loop synthesizer source operating at 300 GHz in silicon. He introduced the first dual-band radar-on-chip with applications in automotive sensing and safety. His contribution in millimeter-wave imaging led to the invention of new concept called "super pixels" in the context of imaging array receivers. Heydari and his team discovered new transceiver architectures that obviate the need for high resolution data converters. This discovery led to the first "beyond-5G" integrated transceiver chipsets in silicon.

Heydari is a Fellow of the National Academy of Inventors. He is a Fellow of the American Association for the Advancement of Science for "pioneering contributions to radio-frequency and millimeter-wave microelectronic circuits, leading to transformative advancements and shaping the landscape of modern communication technologies," and a Fellow of Institute of Electrical and Electronics Engineers (IEEE) for "contributions to silicon-based millimeter-wave integrated circuits and systems." He was an IEEE Distinguished Microwave Lecturer, from 2018 to 202, and was a Distinguished Lecturer of the IEEE Solid-State Circuits Society from 2014 till 2016. He received the 2005 National Science Foundation CAREER Awards. Heydari is the recipient of both the IEEE Circuits and Systems Society Darlington and Guillemin-Cauer Awards.

Heydari gave a keynote speech to the 2013 IEEE GlobalSIP Symposium and a Distinguished Speech to 2014 IEEE Midwest Symposium on Circuits and Systems. He serves on the Technical Program Committee of the International Solid-State Circuits Conference (ISSCC).

Heydari and his research team have published more than 200 international conference and journal articles. They won both the first place and the best concept paper in the 2009 Business Plan Competition at The Paul Merage School of Business. He is the lead principal investigator of the largest National Science Foundation Award ever received by a faculty member affiliated with the University of California, Irvine's Henry Samueli School of Engineering. In February 2018, in its annual meeting, attended by more than 700 business executives, academic leaders and elected officials, the Orange County Business Council recognized Heydari as a "Game Changer, who is transforming the world by his scholarly work."

== Awards and recognitions ==
- 2025 Fellow of the American Association for the Advancement of Science
- 2024 IEEE Circuits and Systems Society Darlington Award
- 2023 IEEE Microwave Theory and Technology Distinguished Educator Award
- 2022 Fellow of the National Academy of Inventors
- 2021 IEEE Custom Integrated Circuits Conference Best Invited Paper Award
- 2021 IEEE Solid-State Circuits Society Innovative Education Award
- 2020 - 2022 UCI Faculty Innovation Fellow
- IEEE Distinguished Lecturer, Microwave Theory and Techniques Society
- IEEE Fellow for contributions to silicon-based millimeter-wave integrated circuits and systems
- IEEE Distinguished Lecturer, Solid-State Circuits Society
- 2009 School of Engineering Best Faculty Research Award, 2009
- 2007 IEEE Circuits and Systems Society Guillemin-Cauer Award
- 2008 Low-Power Design Contest Award at IEEE International Symposium on Low-Power Electronics and Design
- 2005 National Science Foundation CAREER Award
- 2005 IEEE Circuits and Systems Society Darlington Award
- 2000 Best Paper Award, IEEE International Conference on Computer Design (ICCD), 2000
