= Funco =

Funco, Funko, or Funkos may refer to:

- Funco, the parent company of American video game retailer FuncoLand
- Funco (architecture), a style of house found in Cape Verde
- Funco Motorsports, an American off-road motorsport company
- Funko, an American toy company
- FunkOS, a real-time operating system
