= ETHS =

Eths or ETHS may refer to:

- Eths, a French metal band
- East Tennessee Historical Society
- Faßberg Air Base (ICAO code)

== Schools ==
- Eastern Technical High School, Essex, Maryland, United States
- El Toro High School, Lake Forest, California, United States
- Evanston Township High School, Evanston, Illinois, United States

== See also ==
- Eth (disambiguation)
