= Eth (disambiguation) =

Eth (Ð ð) is a letter in some Germanic alphabets.

Eth or ETH may also refer to:

== Language ==
- -eth, an archaic English verb suffix
- Ethiopian sign languages (ISO 639-3 code: eth)

== Places ==
- Eth, Nord, a commune in France
- Ethiopia, a country

== Science and technology ==
- Eigenstate thermalization hypothesis
- Electric train heating
- Ether (currency) (ETH), the cryptocurrency of Ethereum
- Ethernet, in computer networking
- Engineering and Technology History Wiki
- Exponential time hypothesis

=== Chemistry ===
- eth-, a chemical prefix
- Diethyl ether (abbreviation: eth.), an organic compound
- Ethionamide, a chemical compound

== Transport ==
- Eilat Airport (IATA code: ETH), Israel
- Ethiopian Airlines (ICAO code: ETH)

== Other uses ==
- ETH Zurich, the Swiss Federal Institute of Technology
- Extraterrestrial hypothesis, an explanation for UFOs
- Extended-hours trading, also known as electronic trading hours or extended trading hours
- Enter the Haggis, a Canadian celtic rock band
- Erik ten Hag (born 1970), Dutch association football manager
