= Mary Ellen Randall =

American computer engineer

Mary Ellen Randall is an American computer programmer and businesswoman, known for founding the IEEE MOVE program for quickly providing communications and power services in disaster relief. She is the founder and CEO of enterprise software company Ascot Technologies, Inc., in Cary, North Carolina.

== Education and career ==
Randall grew up in upstate New York as the oldest of four children of a banker. She went to nearby Binghamton University, earning a bachelor's degree in mathematics in three years, originally planning to become a mathematics teacher. Later, she returned to Binghamton for a master's degree in computer science.

She began work as a computer programmer for the Singer Corporation, working on flight simulator software. Next, she worked for 22 years at IBM, as a developer of commercial software and as a project manager, before leaving IBM to found Ascot Technologies.

== Recognition ==
Randall received the 2016 IEEE-USA George F. McClure Award for her work with IEEE MOVE. She was named as an IEEE Fellow in 2007 "for leadership in the development and commercialization of audio-video decoders". She was the 2020 recipient of the IEEE Haraden Pratt Award, "for advocacy of member engagement through projects, social networking, awards, service to humanity, inclusion, and outreach in support of IEEE goals".
