= International Conference on Advances in ICT for Emerging Regions =

- Abbreviation: ICTer
- Discipline: Computer Science

Publication details
- Publisher: IEEE
- History: 1998–
- Frequency: annual
- Website: https://www.icter.org

International Conference on Advances in ICT for Emerging Regions (ICTer) is the successor to the seminal International Information Technology Conference (IITC) held in Sri Lanka since 1998. It provides a platform where research done in ICT is presented by both local and foreign Computer Scientists and IT Professionals. In order to get wider international participation and to promote computing research in the fast-emerging regions of the world especially in Asia-Pacific, it was decided to broadbase the IITC conference and link it with the related International Journal ICTer (www.icter.org).

== Overview ==
The conference is attended by about 200 researchers and students each year. Topics of interest have included Technology, Applications, Human-Computer Interaction, Development Processes, and Social, Legal and Ethical Issues. The conference usually includes pre-conference and/or post-conference high-quality tutorials/workshops in areas of current interest in Information and Communication Technology.

The conference was initiated to mark the year of IT declared by the Government of Sri Lanka in 1998. Initially, it was organised by the Infotel Lanka Society and managed by the Council for Information Technology (CINTEC). Management was taken over by the University of Colombo School of Computing (UCSC) in 2003. Infotel Lanka Society organised by conference until 2006. Currently, the UCSC organise and manage the conference.

== Conferences ==
Year	Conference
2020	20th ICTER 2020
2019	19th ICTER 2019
2018	18th ICTER 2018
2017	17th ICTER 2017
2016	16th ICTER 2016
2015	15th ICTER 2015
2013	14th ICTer 2013
2012	13th ICTer 2012
2011	12th ICTer 2011
2010	11th ICTer 2010
2009	e-Asia
2008	9th IITC 2008
2006	8th IITC 2006
2005	7th IITC 2005
2004	6th IITC 2004
2003	5th IITC 2003
2002	4th IITC 2004
2001	3rd IITC 2000
1999	2nd IITC 1999
1998	1st IITC 1998

== Management ==
University of Colombo School of Computing 35, Reid Avenue Colombo 00700 Sri Lanka

== See also ==
- List of computer science conference acronyms
