= Krishnendu Chakrabarty =

- Born: India

Academic background
- Education: B. Tech, 1990, IIT Kharagpur; MS, 1992, PhD, 1995, University of Michigan
- Thesis: Test response compaction for built-in self testing. (1995)

Krishnendu Chakrabarty is an Indian-American electrical and computer engineer. He is the Fulton Professor of Microelectronics at Arizona State University Ira A. Fulton Schools of Engineering. Before joining Arizona State, he was the John Cocke Distinguished Professor and was the Chair of the Department of Electrical and Computer Engineering at Duke University Pratt School of Engineering.

== Early life and education ==
Chakrabarty received his B. Tech. degree from the Indian Institute of Technology, Kharagpur in 1990 and his Ph.D. from the University of Michigan in 1995.

== Career ==
Following his PhD, Chakrabarty remained in the United States and taught at Boston University before joining the faculty at Duke University in 1998. During his early tenure at Duke, Chakrabarty was the recipient of a National Science Foundation Early Faculty Award, the Office of Naval Research Young Investigator Award, and the Humboldt Research Award from the Alexander von Humboldt Foundation. His research focused on creating design automation and optimization techniques for "lab-on-a-chip" devices, "where a wide array of biomedical and chemical tests are miniaturized and completed on a microchip only a few centimeters wide." In 2008, he was recognized by the Association for Computing Machinery when they elected him an ACM Distinguished Member.

While working as a professor of electrical and computer engineering at Duke University Pratt School of Engineering, Chakrabarty was elected an IEEE Fellow for his contributions to computing. Following this, he was appointed the William H. Younger Distinguished Professor of Engineering and was cited by the Institute of Electrical and Electronics Engineers (IEEE) for "pioneering and inspirational research on the design automation and testing of complex chips with the application to microfluidic biochips." In 2016, Chakrabarty was named a Hans Fischer Senior Research Fellow at the Technical University of Munich. In 2017, Chakrabarty was honored with the Charles A. Desoer Technical Achievement Award from the IEEE Circuits and Systems Society for "contributions to the design of microfluidic biochips, testing and design-for-test of system-on-chip and 3-D integrated circuits, and infrastructure optimization of wireless sensor networks, as well as for technical leadership, industry impact, and inspiring researchers worldwide." At the same time, he was also named chair of the Department of Electrical and Computer Engineering at Duke.

In recognition of his scientific contributions, Chakrabarty was awarded a fellowship from the Japan Society for the Promotion of Science in the "Short-term S: Noble Prize Level" category. He was also elected a fellow of the American Association for the Advancement of Science, specifically for his "distinguished contributions to the design of microfluidic biochips and design-for-test of system-on-chip integrated circuits, and for extraordinary technical leadership and mentoring of graduate students." In 2019, Chakrabarty and colleague Amanda Randles were named Senior Members of the National Academy of Inventors.

At the conclusion of the 2019–20 academic year, Chakrabarty was reappointed chair of Duke’s Department of Electrical and Computer Engineering for a three year term. While serving in this role, he was awarded the 2021 IEEE Transactions on VLSI Systems Prize for his paper "Hardware Trojan Detection Using Changepoint-Based Anomaly Detection Techniques." He also received the 2021 Vitold Belevitch Award for major contributions to the study of circuits and systems. He also received the prestigious 2022 Semiconductor Research Corporation Aristotle Award for outstanding student advising during the research projects.
