= International Carnahan Conference on Security Technology =

The IEEE International Carnahan Conference on Security Technology (ICCST) is an annual IEEE conference related to security technology, with a particular focus on physical security, biometrics, information security, threat detection, and cyber security.

The 56th Annual International Carnahan Conference on Security Technology (ICCST 2023) will be held at the Defence Institute of Advanced Technology (DIAT), Girinagar, Pune, India, and is scheduled for 11–15 October 2023.

The conference is named after the Carnahan House, a conference center at the University of Kentucky located in Lexington, Kentucky, USA. The initial conferences were held at this location, hosted by the Lexington Chapter of the IEEE.

== Previous conference locations ==
| Sept 7-9, 2022 | Valec, Czechia |
| Oct. 1-3, 2021 | Online (hosted by University of Hertfordshire, Hatfield, UK) |
| Oct. 1-3, 2019 | Chennai, India |
| Oct. 22-25, 2018 | Montreal, Quebec, Canada |
| Oct. 23-26, 2017 | Madrid, Spain |
| Oct. 24-27, 2016 | Orlando, Florida, USA |
| Sept 21-24, 2015 | Taipei, Taiwan, ROC |
| Oct. 13-16, 2014 | Rome, Italy |
| Oct. 8-11, 2013 | Medellin, Colombia |
| Oct. 15-18, 2012 | Boston, Massachusetts, USA |
| Oct. 18-21, 2011 | Barcelona, Spain |
| Oct. 5-8, 2010 | San Jose, California, USA |
| Oct. 5-8, 2009 | Zurich, Switzerland |
| Oct. 13-16, 2008 | Prague, Czech Republic |
| Oct. 8-11, 2007 | Ottawa, Ontario, Canada |
| Oct. 16-19, 2006 | Lexington, Kentucky, USA |
| Oct. 11-14, 2005 | Las Palmas de Gran Canarias, Spain |
| Oct. 11-14, 2004 | Albuquerque, New Mexico, USA |
| Oct. 14-16, 2003 | Taipei, Taiwan, ROC |
| Oct. 20-24, 2002 | Atlantic City, New Jersey, USA |
| Oct. 16-19, 2001 | London, England |
| Oct. 23-25, 2000 | Ottawa, Ontario, Canada |
| Oct. 5-7, 1999 | Madrid, Spain |
| Oct. 12-14,1998 | Alexandria, Virginia, USA |
| Oct. 14-17, 1997 | Canberra, Australia |
| Oct. 2-4, 1996 | Carnahan House Conference Center |
| Oct. 18-20, 1995 | Sanderstead, Surrey, England |
| Oct. 12-14, 1994 | Albuquerque, New Mexico, USA |
| Oct. 13-15, 1993 | Ottawa, Ontario, Canada |
| Oct. 14-16, 1992 | Atlanta, Georgia, USA |
| Oct. 1-3, 1991 | Taipei, Taiwan |
| Oct. 10-12, 1990 | Carnahan House Conference Center |
| Oct. 3-5. 1989 | Zurich, Switzerland |
| Oct. 5-8, 1988 | Carnahan House Conference Center |
| May 16–17, 1987 | Atlanta, Georgia, USA |
| May 1986 | Gothenburg, Sweden, Charmers University |
| May 5–17, 1985 | Carnahan House Conference Center |
| May 16–18, 1984 | Carnahan House Conference Center |
| Oct. 4-6, 1983 | Zurich, Switzerland |
| May 11–13, 1983 | Carnahan House Conference Center |
| May 12–15, 1982 | Carnahan House Conference Center |
| May 13–15, 1981 | Carnahan House Conference Center |
| Sept 23-26,1980 | Berlin, Germany |
| May 14–17, 1980 | Carnahan House Conference Center |
| May 16–18, 1979 | Menlo Park, California, USA |
| May 17–19, 1978 | Carnahan House Conference Center |
| July 25–29, 1977 | Oxford, England |
| April 6–8, 1977 | Carnahan House Conference Center |
| May 5–7, 1976 | Carnahan House Conference Center |
| May 7–9, 1975 | Carnahan House Conference Center |
| April 16–19, 1974 | Carnahan House Conference Center |
| July 18–20, 1973 | Edinburgh, Scotland |
| April 25–27, 1973 | Carnahan House Conference Center |
| April 19–21, 1972 | Carnahan House Conference Center |
| April 22–24, 1971 | Carnahan House Conference Center |
| April 1970 | Carnahan House Conference Center |
| April 1969 | Carnahan House Conference Center |
| April 19–20, 1968 | Carnahan House Conference Center |
| April 1967 | Carnahan House Conference Center |
