= Iran Workshop on Communication and Information Theory =

The Iran Workshop on Communication and Information Theory (IWCIT) (Persian: کارگاه ملی نظریه اطلاعات و مخابرات) is an international academic workshop that is held annually in one of the Iranian University campuses. The purpose of this workshop is to bring together researchers at the frontiers of communication and information theory worldwide to share and engage in various research activities.

IWCIT features world-class speakers, plenary talks and technical sessions on a diverse range of topics in communication and information theory. IWCIT is the only workshop in Iran with an emphasis on information theory, and is one of the three events that is supported by the related scientific chapter in IEEE Iran section. This workshop is included in the IEEE Conference Publications Program (CPP).

== History ==
=== 2013 ===
The First Iran Workshop on Communication and Information Theory (IWCIT) took place at Sharif University of Technology, Tehran, Iran from Wednesday, 8 May to Thursday, 9 May 2013.

Prof. Gerhard Kramer from the Technical University of Munich was the Keynote Speaker at IWCIT 2013.

=== 2014 ===
The 2nd IWCIT took place at Sharif University of Technology, Tehran, Iran from Wednesday, 7 May to Thursday, 8 May 2014. Distinguished Keynote Speakers at IWCIT 2014 were Prof. Behnaam Aazhang (Department of Electrical and Computer Engineering, Rice University), Prof. David Tse (Department of Electrical Engineering and Computer Sciences, University of California, Berkeley), Prof. Robert Schober (Institute for Digital Communications, University of Erlangen–Nuremberg) and Prof. Gerhard Kramer (Institute for Communications Engineering, Technical University of Munich).

=== 2015 ===
The 3rd IWCIT took place at Sharif University of Technology, Tehran, Iran from Wednesday, 6 May to Thursday, 7 May 2015.

Distinguished Keynote Speakers at IWCIT 2015 included Prof. Imre Csiszár (Alfréd Rényi Institute of Mathematics, Hungarian Academy of Sciences), Prof. Gerhard Kramer (Institute for Communications Engineering, Technical University of Munich), and Prof. Giuseppe Caire (Technische Universität Berlin, Germany).

=== 2016 ===
The 4th IWCIT took place at Sharif University of Technology, Tehran, Iran on Tuesday, 3 May and Wednesday, 4 May 2016. The keynote speakers of the workshop were Prof. Thomas Kailath and Prof. Raymond Yeung.

== Scope ==
The scope of the workshop includes the following topics:

- Shannon Theory: including Complexity theory, Information theoretic security, Multi-terminal information theory and Quantum information theory
- Communication Theory: including Cognitive radio systems, Cooperative communications, Network resource sharing and scheduling, Molecular and Nano communications, and Optical and Quantum communication theory
- Coding Theory: including Compressed sensing, Data compression, and Network coding.
- Applications of Information Theory: information theory in learning, data mining, signal processing, statistics and biology.
