= Shawn Blanton =

American electrical engineer

- Education: University of Michigan
- Scientific career
- Fields: Electrical Engineer
- Workplaces: Carnegie Mellon University
- Doctoral advisor: John P. Hayes

Shawn Blanton is an American computer engineer and electrical engineer, Associate Department Head for Research and Joseph F. and Nancy Keithley Professor of Electrical and Computer Engineering at the Carnegie Mellon University. His research interests include integrated system testing, testable design, and test methodology development.

== Education ==
Blanton obtained a B.S. degree in Engineering from Calvin College in 1987. He obtained an M.S. degree in Electrical and Computer Engineering from University of Arizona in 1989. In 1995, Blanton received his Ph.D. in Electrical Engineering and Computer Science from the University of Michigan, Ann Arbor. John P. Hayes was his doctoral adviser.

== Awards and honors ==
Blanton received the National Science Foundation CAREER Award in 1997, and IBM Faculty Partnership Awards in 2005 and 2006. He is an IEEE Fellow.
