= IEEE International Frequency Control Symposium =

IEEE International Frequency Control Symposium (IFCS)
- Founded: 1947; 79 years ago
- Type: Professional association
- Purpose: Frequency Control
- Region served: Worldwide
- Method: Conferences and Proceedings Publications
- Parent organization: IEEE Ultrasonics, Ferroelectrics, and Frequency Control Society
- Website: ieee-uffc.org/symposia/ifcs

IEEE International Frequency Control Symposium (IFCS) started in 1947 and its name has changed over the years. It is one of the conferences sponsored by the IEEE Ultrasonics, Ferroelectrics, and Frequency Control Society (UFFC-S). IEEE IFCS has been an annual conference since its start in 1947.

The Frequency Control Standing Committee of the IEEE UFFC-S is responsible for the organization of IEEE IFCS.
