= Symposium on Applied Computing =

The ACM Symposium on Applied Computing is an annual conference sponsored by the ACM Special Interest Group on Applied Computing.

The first Symposium on Applied Computing was held in 1985. Since the 1990s, the acceptance ratio for paper submissions has dropped from 54 to 67% to below 30% in the 2008 SAC held in Fortaleza, Brazil. The 2009 conference was held in Honolulu, Hawaii.

== See also ==
- List of computer science conferences
