= International Conference on Communications =

IEEE annual conference series on telecommunications

The International Conference on Communications (ICC) is an annual international academic conference organised by the Institute of Electrical and Electronics Engineers' Communications Society. The conference grew out of the Global Communications Conference (GLOBECOM) when, in 1965, the seventh GLOBECOM was sponsored by the Communications Society's predecessor as the "IEEE Communications Convention". The following year it adopted its current name and GLOBECOM was disbanded (it has since been revived). The conference was held in the United States until 1984 when it was held in Amsterdam; it has since been held in several other countries.

Some major telecommunications discoveries have been announced at ICC, such as the invention of turbo codes. In fact, this ground breaking paper had been submitted to ICC the previous year, but was rejected by the referees who thought the results too good to be true.

Recent ICCs have been attended by 2500–3000 people.

== Conferences ==
History of the ICC conference
Year	City	Country	Date
2029	Paris	France	
2028	Chengdu	China	
2027	Washington, D.C.	United States	30 May–3 June
2026	Glasgow	United Kingdom	24-28 May
2025	Montreal	Canada	7-13 June
2024	Denver	United States	9-13 June
2023	Rome	Italy	28 May-1 June
2022	Seoul	South Korea	16–20 May
2021	Montreal	Canada	14–18 June
2020	Dublin	Ireland	7–11 June
2019	Shanghai	China	20–24 May
2018	Kansas City	United States	20–24 May
2017	Paris	France	21–25 May
2016	Kuala Lumpur	Malaysia	23–27 May
2015	London	United Kingdom	8–12 June
2014	Sydney	Australia	10–14 June
2013	Budapest	Hungary	9–13 June
2012	Ottawa	Canada	10–15 June
2011	Kyoto	Japan	5–9 June
2010	Cape Town	South Africa	23–27 May
2009	Dresden	Germany	14–18 June
2008	Beijing	China	19–23 May
2007	Glasgow	United Kingdom	24–28 June
2006	Istanbul	Turkey	11–15 June
2005	Seoul	Korea	16–20 May
2004	Paris	France	20–24 June
2003	Anchorage, Alaska	United States	11–15 May
2002	New York City	United States	28 April - 2 May
2001	Helsinki	Finland	11–14 June
2000	New Orleans	United States	18–22 June
1999	Vancouver	Canada	6–10 June
1998	Atlanta	United States	7–11 June
1997	Montreal	Canada	8–12 June
1996	Dallas	United States	23–27 June
1995	Seattle	United States	18–22 June
1994	New Orleans	United States	1–5 May
1993	Geneva	Switzerland	23–26 May
1992	Chicago	United States	14–18 June
1991	Denver	United States	23–26 June
1990	Atlanta	United States	16-19 April
1989	Boston	United States	11-14 June
1988	Philadelphia	United States	12-15 June
1987	Seattle	United States	7-10 June
1986	Toronto	Canada	22-25 June
1985	Chicago	United States	23–26 June
1984	Amsterdam	The Netherlands	14-17 May
