= International Symposium on Physical Design =

Technical conference on electronic design automation

The International Symposium on Physical Design (ISPD) is a yearly conference on the topic of electronic design automation, concentrating on algorithms for the physical design of integrated circuits. It is typically held in March or April of each year. Locations used to be cities in the western United States or in Texas. ISPD 2024 was the first symposium outside of the U.S., it took place in Taipei, Taiwan. The 2026 symposium will be located in Bonn, Germany.

It is sponsored by the SIGDA of the Association for Computing Machinery and the IEEE Council on Electronic Design Automation (CEDA).

ISPD is purely a technical conference with no associated trade show.

== See also ==
- Design Automation Conference
- International Conference on Computer-Aided Design
- Asia and South Pacific Design Automation Conference
- Design Automation and Test in Europe
