= Vehicular Technology Conference =

Semi-annual academic conference

The Vehicular Technology Conference (VTC) is a semiannual international academic conference on wireless communications organized by the Institute of Electrical and Electronics Engineers' Vehicular Technology Society.

== History ==
The first conference was held in Detroit, Michigan, United States in 1950 and then annually until 1998. Since 1999, the conference has been held in spring and fall, when it is known as VTC Spring and VTC Fall respectively. The alignment with the seasons has meant that the conference has almost always been held in the Northern Hemisphere, but in May 2006, VTC Spring was held in Melbourne, Victoria, Australia, visiting the Southern Hemisphere for the first time.

Recent VTCs have been attended by about 600-700 people. The conference focuses mainly on the physical layer and medium access control layer (PHY and MAC) of wireless systems.
