= International Conference on Software Engineering and Formal Methods =

International conference series

SEFM, International Conference on Software Engineering and Formal Methods
- Status: Active
- Frequency: Annual
- Years active: 2003–present
- Founded: September 2003; 22 years ago, Brisbane, Australia
- Area: Software engineering; formal methods
- Sponsors: IEEE Computer Society
- Website: sefm-conference.github.io

The International Conference on Software Engineering and Formal Methods (SEFM) is an international academic conference in the field of software engineering with a specialization in formal methods.

== History ==
Until 2002, SEFM was a workshop; it then became a full international conference. It is sponsored by the IEEE Computer Society. The 1st IEEE International Conference on Software Engineering and Formal Methods (SEFM 2003) was held at Brisbane, Australia in September 2003. Submissions originated from 22 different countries. As well as IEEE-CS, supporters for SEFM 2003 included the Australian Computer Society (ACS), Boeing Australia, and the Italian Embassy in Canberra.

The proceedings for the conference are published by Springer in the Lecture Notes in Computer Science (LNCS) series since 2011. Previously, the proceedings were published by IEEE.

== Aims ==
SEFM aims to bring together practitioners and researchers from academia, industry, and government, to advance the state of the art in formal methods, to help in their large-scale application in the software industry, and to encourage their integration with other practical software engineering methods. The conferences are often held in the Asia and Pacific regions and specifically in developing countries. The SEFM conferences aim to encourage research cooperation between developing countries and industrialized countries. SEFM 2010 was in Pisa, Italy. SEFM 2013 was in Madrid, Spain. SEFM 2014 took place in Grenoble, France. More recently, SEFM 2024 took place in Aveiro, Portugal. SEFM 2025 is in Madrid, Spain.

The SEFM conference series is included on the DBLP online publications database. It is included on the VIAF database. Revised selected papers sometimes appear as special journal issues. The conference is also covered in external reports. The conference proceedings are indexed by the Association for Computing Machinery (ACM).
