= Toffoli =

Italian surname

Toffoli is an Italian surname. Notable people with the surname include:

- Dario De Toffoli, Italian board game designer
- Dias Toffoli (born 1967), President of the Supreme Federal Court of Brazil
- Elisa (Italian singer) (born 1977), full name Elisa Toffoli, Italian singer-songwriter
- Gaúcho (footballer) (1964–2016), full name Luís Carlos Toffoli, Brazilian footballer
- Patricia Tóffoli (born 1960), Venezuelan beauty pageant titleholder
- Tommaso Toffoli (born 1943), Italian-American professor of engineering at Boston University
  - Toffoli gate, a reversible logic gate invented by Tommaso Toffoli
- Tyler Toffoli (born 1992), Canadian ice hockey player
