= Funco Motorsports =

American off-road motorsport manufacturer

- Industry: Automotive
- Founded: 1968; 58 years ago
- Headquarters: Rialto, California, United States
- Products: Off-road racing vehicles
- Website: funcomotorsports.com

Funco Motorsports is an American motorsport manufacturer specializing in developing high-performance sand cars.

== History ==
Funco Motorsports was founded by Gilmon "Gil" George in 1968. In 2007, George was inducted into the Off-Road Motorsports Hall of Fame located in Jean, Nevada. George died in October 2019.

"Funco" is a portmanteau of "Fun Company".

== Models ==
Funco Motorsports currently produces the following vehicles:

F series
F9, FD9

G series
G52/GEN6, GT ANA, GTF/GTX, GTU

=== Funco F9 ===
Funco Motorsports' flagship vehicle is the rear-wheel drive F9 sand car, which has an output of over 1,200 horsepower and is powered by a V8 engine. Red Bull Torque 2017, held in December 2017 in the United Arab Emirates, used Funco F9 sand cars as the series vehicles.

The 2018 Funco F9 is featured in open-world racing games Forza Horizon 4 and 5. A Forza-themed F9 remote-controlled car is sold by New Bright.
