= International Conference on Formal Techniques for Networked and Distributed Systems =

The IFIP International Conference on Formal Techniques for Distributed Objects, Components and Systems (FORTE) is part of the federated conference event DisCoTec (Distributed Computing Techniques) which also includes the International Conference on Coordination Models and Languages (COORDINATION) and the IFIP International Conference on Distributed Applications and Interoperable Systems (DAIS).

Until 2013, the conference was held as IFIP Joint International Conference on Formal Techniques for Distributed Systems and consisted of the two conference series FMOODS and FORTE.

== Scope ==
The joined conference FMOODS/FORTE is a forum for fundamental research on theory, models, tools and applications of distributed systems. The conference solicits original contributions that advance the science and technologies for distributed systems, in particular in the areas of:

- component- and model-based design
- object technology, modularity, software adaptation
- service-oriented, ubiquitous, pervasive, grid, cloud and mobile computing systems
- software quality, reliability, availability and security
- security, privacy and trust in distributed systems
- adaptive distributed systems, self-stabilization
- self-healing/organizing
- verification, validation, formal analysis and testing of the above

Contributions that combine theory and practice and that exploit formal methods and theoretical foundations to present novel solutions to problems arising from the development of distributed systems are encouraged. This conference covers distributed computing models and formal specification, testing and verification methods. The application domains include all kinds of application-level distributed systems, telecommunication services, Internet, embedded and real-time systems, as well as networking and communication security and reliability.

== Previous Conferences ==
=== Web pages ===
- FORTE 2014
- FMOODS / FORTE 2013
- FMOODS / FORTE 2012 is offline
- FMOODS / FORTE 2011
- FMOODS / FORTE 2010 is offline
- FMOODS / FORTE 2009
- FMOODS 2008 / FORTE 2008 is offline
- FMOODS 2007 / FORTE 2007
- FMOODS 2006 / FORTE 2006
- FMOODS 2005 / FORTE 2005
- FORTE 2004
- FMOODS 2003 is offline / FORTE 2003 is offline
- FMOODS 2002 / FORTE 2002
- FORTE 2001 is offline
- FMOODS 2000 / FORTE 2000 is offline
- FMOODS 1999 is offline / FORTE 1999
- FORTE 1998
- FMOODS 1997 is offline / FORTE 1997 is offline
- FMOODS 1996 / FORTE 1996 is offline

=== Proceedings ===
- FMOODS / FORTE 2013 (LNCS 7892)
- FMOODS / FORTE 2012 (LNCS 7273)
- FMOODS / FORTE 2011 (LNCS 6722)
- FMOODS / FORTE 2010 (LNCS 6117)
- FMOODS / FORTE 2009 (LNCS 5522)
- FMOODS 2008 (LNCS 5051) / FORTE 2008 (LNCS 5048)
- FMOODS 2007 (LNCS 4468) / FORTE 2007 (LNCS 4574)
- FMOODS 2006 (LNCS 4037) / FORTE 2006 (LNCS 4229)
- FMOODS 2005 (LNCS 3535) / FORTE 2005 (LNCS 3731)
- FORTE 2004 (LNCS 3235)
- FMOODS 2003 (LNCS 2884) / FORTE 2003 (LNCS 2767)
- FMOODS 2002 (IFIP ACIT) / FORTE 2002 (LNCS 2529)
- FMOODS 2000 (IFIP ACIT)
- FMOODS 1999 (IFIP ACIT)
- FORTE 1997 (IFIP AICT)
