= New Bright =

American radio-controlled toy manufacturer

New Bright Industrial Co., Ltd.
- Type: Private company
- Industry: Toy industry
- Founded: 1955; 71 years ago
- Headquarters: Wixom, Michigan, United States
- Products: Radio-controlled vehicles Toy trucks
- Website: www.newbright.com

New Bright (officially New Bright Industrial Co., Ltd.) is an American toy manufacturer specializing primarily in radio-controlled vehicles headquartered in Wixom, Michigan.

== History ==
New Bright was founded in 1955 and was known for its battery-operated and sometimes electric toy trains sold for Christmas (1986-2012). New Bright has since introduced other radio-controlled toy types such as cars, boats, and toy robots developed with iRobot.

== Products ==
New Bright sells radio-controlled licensed sports cars, monster trucks, ATVs, and speedboats including Forza Motorsport-themed Bugatti and Chevrolet cars and two RC vehicles (Jeep Wrangler Trailcat concept and Ford Bronco racing truck) with mobile app-connected cameras marketed as DashCams, as well as unlicensed New Bright-branded products, including monster trucks, drag racers, dune buggies, Christmas-exclusive trains, and radio-controlled wheeled insects and spiders. Aside from RC vehicles, New Bright also sells a small number of non-remote-controlled free-rolling toy construction vehicles, car carrier trucks, and monster trucks.

=== Licensed products ===
Licensed RC vehicles currently sold by New Bright include:

Monster trucks

- Bigfoot
- Chevrolet K5 Blazer
- Chevrolet Silverado
- Ford Bronco
- Ford Bronco Sport
- Ford F-150
- Ford F-150 Lightning
- Ford F-150 Raptor
- Ford Super Duty
- GMC Hummer EV
- Jeep Gladiator
- Jeep Wrangler
- Nissan Frontier
- Ram 1500

Sports cars

- Bugatti Chiron
- Chevrolet Camaro
- Chevrolet Corvette C7
- Chevrolet Corvette C8
- Dodge Challenger
- Ferrari FXX-K
- Ferrari LaFerrari
- Ford Mustang
- Ford Mustang Mach-E
- Ford Mustang Shelby GT500

Other

- Funco F9 (dune buggy)
- MasterCraft X-23 (speedboat)
- Polaris RZR (ATV)
