= IEEE Vehicular Technology Society =

Telecommunications organization

The IEEE Vehicular Technology Society (VTS) was founded in 1949 as the Institute of Radio Engineers' (IRE) Committee on Vehicular and Railroad Radio. The Society's name has changed five times since then and its scope has expanded to include not only the "Radio" of the original name, but all manners of electronics associated with vehicular systems. The Society (then known as the IRE Professional Group on Vehicular Communications) held its first "Meeting" (now Conference) in Detroit in 1950. The Society's first Transactions was published in 1952. Like the Society, the Transactions has carried many names. The Society has approximately 45 local chapters throughout the world.

== Field of Interest ==
The fields of interest of the Society are the theoretical, experimental and operational aspects of electrical and electronics engineering in mobile radio, motor vehicles and land transportation. (a) Mobile radio shall include all terrestrial mobile services. (b) Motor vehicles shall include the components and systems and motive power for propulsion and auxiliary functions. (c) Land transportation shall include the components and systems used in both automated and non-automated facets of ground transport technology.

== Publications ==
The Society sponsors two publications: IEEE Transactions on Vehicular Technology and Vehicular Technology Magazine. The Transactions are published monthly, encompassing approximately 12500 pages of peer-reviewed material annually. The Magazine is published quarterly, including both peer-reviewed and general interest features.

== Conferences ==
The Society's flagship conference, the Vehicular Technology Conference (VTC) began in 1950 and was held annually through 1998. In 1999, the Society began holding the VTC semi-annually. The Society also sponsors or co-sponsors a number of other conferences and symposia, including JRC, VPPC, ICCVE, CAVS, and WiVEC.

== See also ==
- IEEE Transactions on Vehicular Technology
