= Diana Marculescu =

Romanian scientist

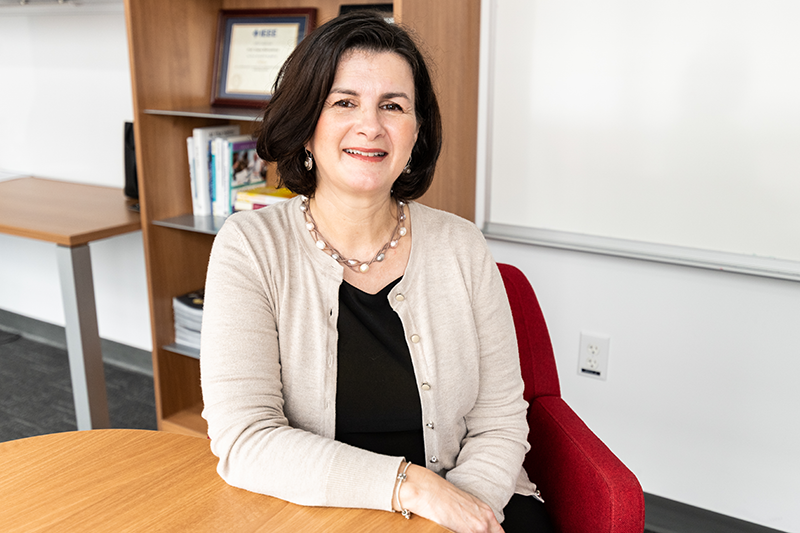

Chair of the Department of Electrical and Computer Engineering at the Cockrell School of Engineering at the University of Texas at Austin
- Incumbent
- Assumed office December 1, 2019
- Preceded by: Ahmed Tewfik

Personal details
- Born: Romania
- Education: Politehnica University of Bucharest, University of Southern California
- Profession: Computer scientist, academic

Diana Marculescu is the Department Chair and Motorola Regents Chair in Electrical and Computer Engineering at the University of Texas at Austin. She was formerly the David Edward Schramm Professor of Electrical and Computer Engineering at Carnegie Mellon University. She is the first female chair in the department's history.

== Education and career ==
Marculescu received a degree in computer science from Politehnica University of Bucharest, Romania, in 1991, and a Ph.D. in computer engineering from the University of Southern California in 1998. From 2014 to 2018, she served as Associate Department Head for Academic Affairs in Electrical and Computer Engineering, and, from 2015 to 2019, was the founding director of the College of Engineering Center for Faculty Success. In 2019, the Cockrell School of Engineering at the University of Texas at Austin, had named her New Chair of Electrical and Computer Engineering.

== Awards and recognitions ==
Marculescu was named an ACM Distinguished Member for her significant impact on the computing field in 2011. "Our proposed power management techniques include the use of Voltage Frequency Islands (VFI), where we are able to guarantee a certain performance level with minimum power, even under decreased reliability or increased variation," Marculescu said. "Our new VFI-based design style enables fine-grain power management for many-core systems, including both the hardware and software in computer systems. The proposed power management mechanism will also ultimately help cut energy costs."

She was named an IEEE Fellow in 2015 for contributions to design and optimization of energy-aware computing systems. She was elected as an ACM Fellow in 2019 "for contributions to the design and optimization of energy-aware computing systems". She was an IEEE-Circuits and Systems Society Distinguished Lecturer (2004-2005), and chair of the ACM Special Interest Group on Design Automation (2005-2009).
