= Radu Marculescu =

Electrical and Computer Engineering researcher

Radu Marculescu is a professor of electrical and computer engineering at the University of Texas at Austin, where he holds the Laura Jennings Turner Chair in Engineering. He moved to the University of Texas from Carnegie Mellon University, where he was a professor from 2000 to 2019.

Marculescu was named Fellow of the Institute of Electrical and Electronics Engineers (IEEE) in 2013, "for contributions to design and optimization of on-chip communication for embedded multicore systems". He was named to the 2022 class of ACM Fellows, "for contributions to low-power and communication-based design of embedded systems".
