= Global Communications Conference =

IEEE annual conference series

The Global Communications Conference (GLOBECOM) is an annual international academic conference organised by the Institute of Electrical and Electronics Engineers' Communications Society. The first GLOBECOM was organised by the Communications Society's predecessor in 1957, with the full name of "National Symposium on Global Communications". The seventh GLOBECOM, in 1965 was called the "IEEE Communications Convention" and after that the conference was renamed as the International Conference on Communications (ICC) and GLOBECOM was no longer organised.

By 1982, the need for a second annual international conference on communications was apparent, and so the IEEE National Telecommunications Conference was re-organised to be international in scope, and renamed to the "Global Communications Conference", resurrecting the GLOBECOM acronym. GLOBECOM has been held annually since.

Recent GLOBECOMs have been attended by about 1,500 people. IEEE has more than 400,000 members in 150 countries.

== Past and Upcoming Conferences ==
History of the GLOBECOM conference
Year	City	Country (Region)	Date
2029	Hong Kong	China	
2028	Hawaii	United States of America	
2027	Abu Dhabi	United Arab Emirates	6-10 December
2026	Macao	China	7-11 December
2025	Taipei	Taiwan	8-12 December
2024	Cape Town	South Africa	8-12 December
2023	Kuala Lumpur	Malaysia	4-8 December
2022	Rio de Janeiro	Brazil	4-8 December
2021	Madrid	Spain	7-11 December
2020	Taipei	Taiwan	7-11 December
2019	Waikoloa, Hawaii	United States of America	9-13 December
2018	Abu Dhabi	United Arab Emirates	9-13 December
2017	Singapore	Singapore	4-8 December
2016	Washington D.C.	United States of America	4-8 December
2015	San Diego	United States of America	6-10 December
2014	Austin	United States of America	8-12 December
2013	Atlanta	United States of America	9-13 December
2012	Anaheim	United States of America	3-7 December
2011	Houston	United States of America	5-9 December
2010	Miami	United States of America	6-10 December
2009	Honolulu	United States of America	30 November - 4 December
2008	New Orleans	United States of America	30 November - 4 December
2007	Washington, D.C.	United States of America	26-30 November
2006	San Francisco	United States of America	27 November - 1 December
2005	St. Louis	United States of America	28 November - 2 December
2004	Dallas	United States of America	29 November - 3 December
2003	San Francisco	United States of America	1-5 December
2002	Taipei	Taiwan	17-21 November
2001	San Antonio	United States of America	25-29 November
2000	San Francisco	United States of America	27 November - 1 December
1999	Rio de Janeiro	Brazil	5-9 December
1998	Sydney	Australia	8-12 November
1997	Phoenix, Arizona	United States of America	3-8 November
1996	London	United Kingdom	18-22 November
1995	Singapore	Singapore	14-16 November
1994	San Francisco	United States of America	28 November - 2 December
1993	Houston	United States of America	29 November - 2 December
1992	Orlando, Florida	United States of America	6-9 December
1991	Phoenix, Arizona	United States of America	2-5 November
1990	San Diego	United States of America	2-5 December
1989	Dallas	United States of America	27-30 November
1988	Hollywood, Florida	United States of America	28 November - 1 December
1987	Tokyo	Japan	15-18 November
1986	Houston	United States of America	2-4 December
1985	New Orleans	United States of America	2-5 December
1984	Atlanta	United States of America	26-29 November
1983	San Diego	United States of America	28 November - 1 December
1982	Miami	United States of America	29 November - 2 December

== See also ==
- 1912 London International Radiotelegraphic Convention
- Communications
