= Engineering and Technology History Wiki =

Website for the history of technology

The Engineering and Technology History Wiki (ETHW) is a MediaWiki-based website dedicated to the history of technology. It started operating in 2015. It consists of articles, first-hand accounts, oral histories, landmarks and milestones.

A partnership between the United Engineering Foundation (UEF) and its member engineering organizations ASCE, AIME, AIChE, ASME, IEEE as well as the Society of Women Engineers is developing the ETHW as a central repository for the documentation, analysis and explanation of the history of technology.

== Origins ==
In September 2008, the IEEE History Committee founded the IEEE Global History Network, which operated from 2008 to 2014. The ETHW became successor to the former IEEE Global History Network (IEEE GHN).

Originally, the United Engineering Foundation had made a grant to develop an engineering intersociety web platform as a central historical repository. Initially, the work was mainly done at the IEEE History Center. annexed to the Stevens Institute of Technology in Hoboken, NJ.

At the beginning, most content was related to electrical, electronics and computer engineering. As the fields of civil engineering, mining, metallurgical and petroleum engineering, chemical engineering and mechanical engineering are covered by members of the respective organizations now, ETHW is becoming a global record for preserving knowledge of the history of technological innovation in a broad sense. It differs from other online sources, as personal accounts of technical innovators as primary sources are made available to the public. After its start as a common platform for several engineering societies, the Society of Women Engineers and the Society of Petroleum Engineers have contributed new content as well.

As of 2018, ETHW included thousands of wiki entries, and recorded over 800 oral histories.

== Comparison with Wikipedia ==
ETHW is a semi-open wiki. In contrast to Wikipedia, no anonymous writing is allowed. Members of the affiliated engineering organizations can contribute their own autobiographical professional history and experiences as First-hand History or are interviewed to provide their Oral History. Administrators review these postings to see whether they conform with the rules established. In contrast to ETHW encyclopedia articles and landmarks/milestones, such content is subjective and not peer reviewed. Changes can only be made by the original author. Not all content can be used freely by everybody.
