= Asia and South Pacific Design Automation Conference =

International conference on VLSI design automation

The Asia and South Pacific Design Automation Conference (ASP-DAC) is the international conference on VLSI design automation in Asia and South Pacific regions, the most active region of design, CAD and fabrication of silicon chips in the world. The ASP-DAC is a high-quality and premium conference on electronic design automation (EDA) like other sister conferences such as Design Automation Conference (DAC), International Conference on Computer Aided Design (ICCAD), Design, Automation & Test in Europe (DATE). Founded in 1995, the conference aims to provide a platform for researchers and designers to exchange ideas and understand the latest technologies in the areas of LSI design and design automation.

== See also ==
- Design Automation Conference
- International Conference on Computer-Aided Design
- Design Automation and Test in Europe
