= International Conference on Computer-Aided Design =

ICCAD, International Conference on Computer-Aided Design
- Status: Active
- Frequency: Annual
- Years active: 43
- Founded: November 1982; 44 years ago, San Jose, California, United States
- Next event: ICCAD2023
- Participants: 600
- Area: Electronic design automation
- Sponsors: ACM Special Interest Group on Design Automation and IEEE Council on Electronic Design Automation, IEEE Circuits and Systems Society
- Website: International Conference on Computer-Aided Design

The International Conference on Computer-Aided Design (ICCAD) is a yearly conference about electronic design automation. From the start in 1982 until 2014 the conference was held in San Jose, California. It is sponsored by the IEEE Circuits and Systems Society, Computer-Aided Design Technical Committee (CANDE), the IEEE Council on Electronic Design Automation (CEDA), and SIGDA, and in cooperation with the IEEE Electron Devices Society and the IEEE Solid State Circuits Society.

Unlike the Design Automation Conference, Design Automation and Test in Europe (DATE), and Asia and South Pacific Design Automation Conference (ASP-DAC), ICCAD is primarily a technical conference, with only a small trade show component.

== ICCAD Student Scholar Program ==
The ICCAD Scholar Program assists students who lack other support opportunities to attend ICCAD conferences to participate in activities such as:

- Presenting a paper
- CADathlon
- IC/CAD contest
- SRC
- Joining the job fair

== ICCAD's CAD Contest ==
Since 2012, the CAD Contest at ICCAD has been research and development competition, focusing on advanced, real-world problems in the field of Electronic Design Automation (EDA).

== See also ==
- electronic design automation
- EDA Software Category
- Design Automation Conference
- Asia and South Pacific Design Automation Conference
- Design Automation and Test in Europe
- Symposia on VLSI Technology and Circuits
