= Design Automation and Test in Europe =

DATE, Design Automation and Test in Europe
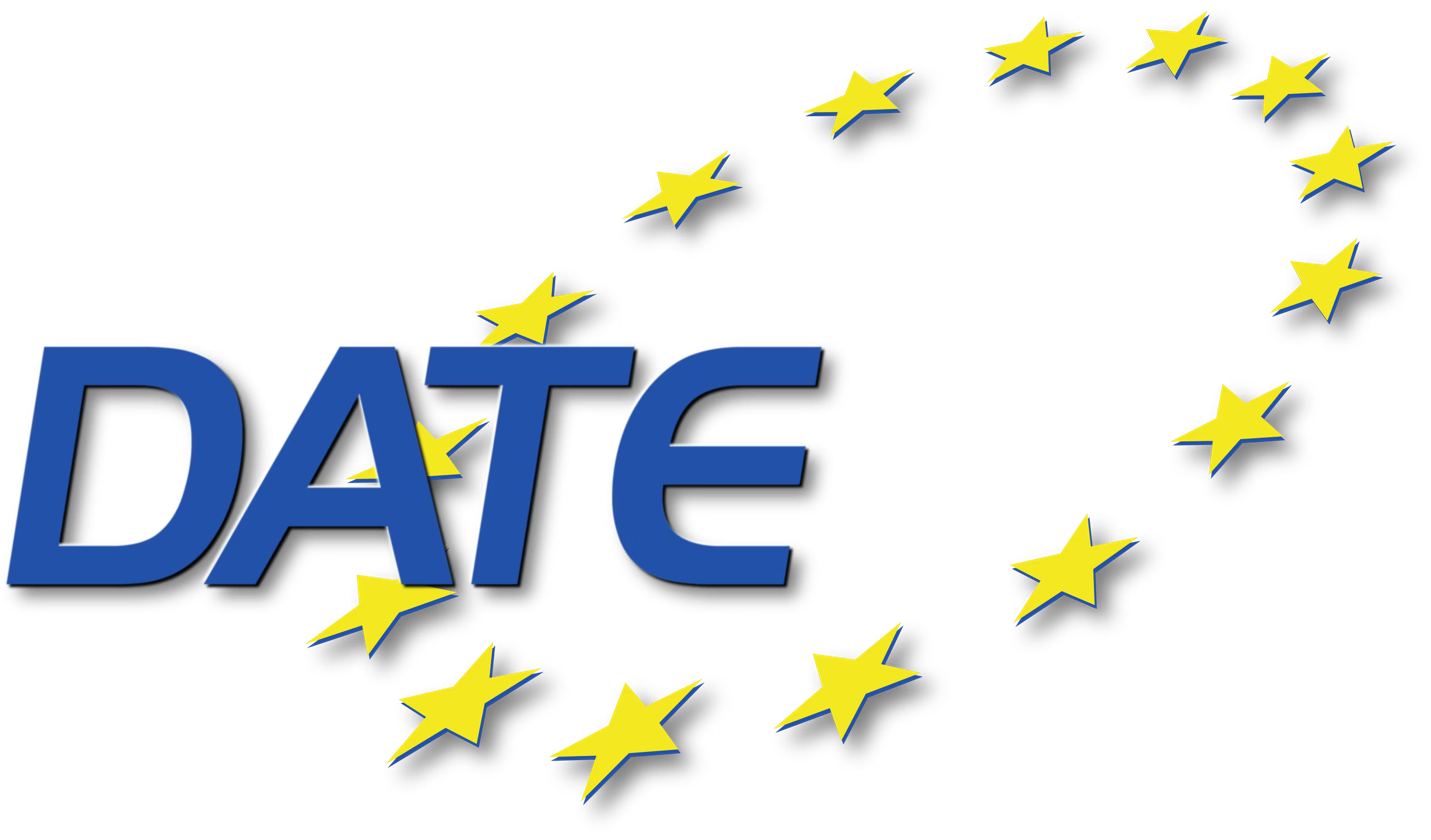
- Status: Active
- Frequency: Annual
- Years active: 28
- Founded: February 1998; 28 years ago in Paris, France
- Next event: DATE2027 in Dresden, Germany
- Participants: 1200
- Area: Electronic design automation
- Sponsors: ACM Special Interest Group on Design Automation (SIGDA), the Electronic System Design Alliance (ESDA), the European Design and Automation Association (EDAA), and the IEEE Council on Electronic Design Automation (CEDA)
- Website: DATE

Design, Automation & Test in Europe (DATE) is a yearly conference on the topic of electronic design automation, typically held in March or April at rotating venues across Western Europe. DATE is a combination of a technical conference and a small trade show. It was formed in 1998 as a merger of EDAC, ETC, Euro-ASIC, and Euro-DAC. It is sponsored by the SIGDA of the Association for Computing Machinery, the Electronic System Design Alliance, the European Design and Automation Association (EDAA), and the IEEE Council on Electronic Design Automation (CEDA). Technical co-sponsors include ACM SIGBED, the IEEE Solid-State Circuits Society (SSCS), IFIP, and the Institution of Engineering and Technology (IET).

== Areas of submission ==
The DATE conference invites research papers in many areas related to electronic design automation. These topics are grouped into four main tracks: design methods, applications, testing, and embedded systems:

- Track D: Design Methods and Tools covers research on how to build better design tools and methods. Topics include high-level synthesis, system simulation, formal verification, low-power and secure design, reconfigurable systems, and new ideas like quantum computing and approximate computing.
- Track A: Application Design focuses on real-world examples. It includes designs for smart energy systems, secure and autonomous systems, artificial intelligence, and new technologies used in practical ways.
- Track T: Test and Dependability is about testing and reliability. It includes fault detection, circuit testing, secure system validation, and ways to make sure systems work even when there are errors.
- Track E: Embedded Systems Design includes software and hardware for embedded and cyber-physical systems. Topics cover real-time systems, secure systems, software tools, and using machine learning in embedded devices.

Each track has several specific topics. Authors can choose the one that fits their work. All papers are peer-reviewed and must present original and useful research.

== Young People Programme ==
The DATE conference hosts the Young People Programme, an initiative aimed at supporting early-career researchers and strengthening academic-industry connections. First introduced in 2019, the program offers career development resources for master's students, PhD candidates, and postdoctoral researchers. It also provides introduces companies and universities to potential employees. The programme includes networking events, mentorship opportunities, and recruiting activities to help participants explore career paths and build professional relationships.

== Conference archive ==
The following table lists past editions of the DATE (Design, Automation and Test in Europe) conference, including the host cities and years. A full archive of events and proceedings is available on the official DATE website. Additional bibliographic information is available through the DBLP computer science bibliography. Proceedings for each year are accessible via IEEE Xplore.

Year	Location	Proceedings
2025	Lyon, France	
2024	Valencia, Spain	
2023	Antwerp, Belgium	
2022	Antwerp, Belgium	
2021	Grenoble, France	
2020	Grenoble, France	
2019	Florence, Italy	
2018	Dresden, Germany	
2017	Lausanne, Switzerland	
2016	Dresden, Germany	
2015	Grenoble, France	
2014	Dresden, Germany	
2013	Grenoble, France	
2012	Dresden, Germany	
2011	Grenoble, France	
2010	Dresden, Germany	
2009	Nice, France	
2008	Munich, Germany	
2007	Nice, France	
2006	Munich, Germany	
2005	Munich, Germany	
2004	Paris, France	
2003	Munich, Germany	
2002	Paris, France	
2001	Munich, Germany	
2000	Paris, France	
1999	Munich, Germany	
1998	Paris, France	

== Late Breaking Results ==
The DATE conference offers a special track for Late Breaking Results (LBR). This track allows researchers to share new ideas, early-stage findings, or innovative directions that are still in progress. LBR submissions are limited to two pages and must follow the official template. All submissions are reviewed through a blind peer-review process. Selected papers are presented in interactive sessions, where authors can receive feedback and discuss their work with the community.

== See also ==
- Electronic design automation
- Category:Electronic design automation software (EDA software category)
- Design Automation Conference
- International Conference on Computer-Aided Design
- Asia and South Pacific Design Automation Conference
- Symposia on VLSI Technology and Circuits
