= International Linguistics Olympiad =

Secondary student science competition

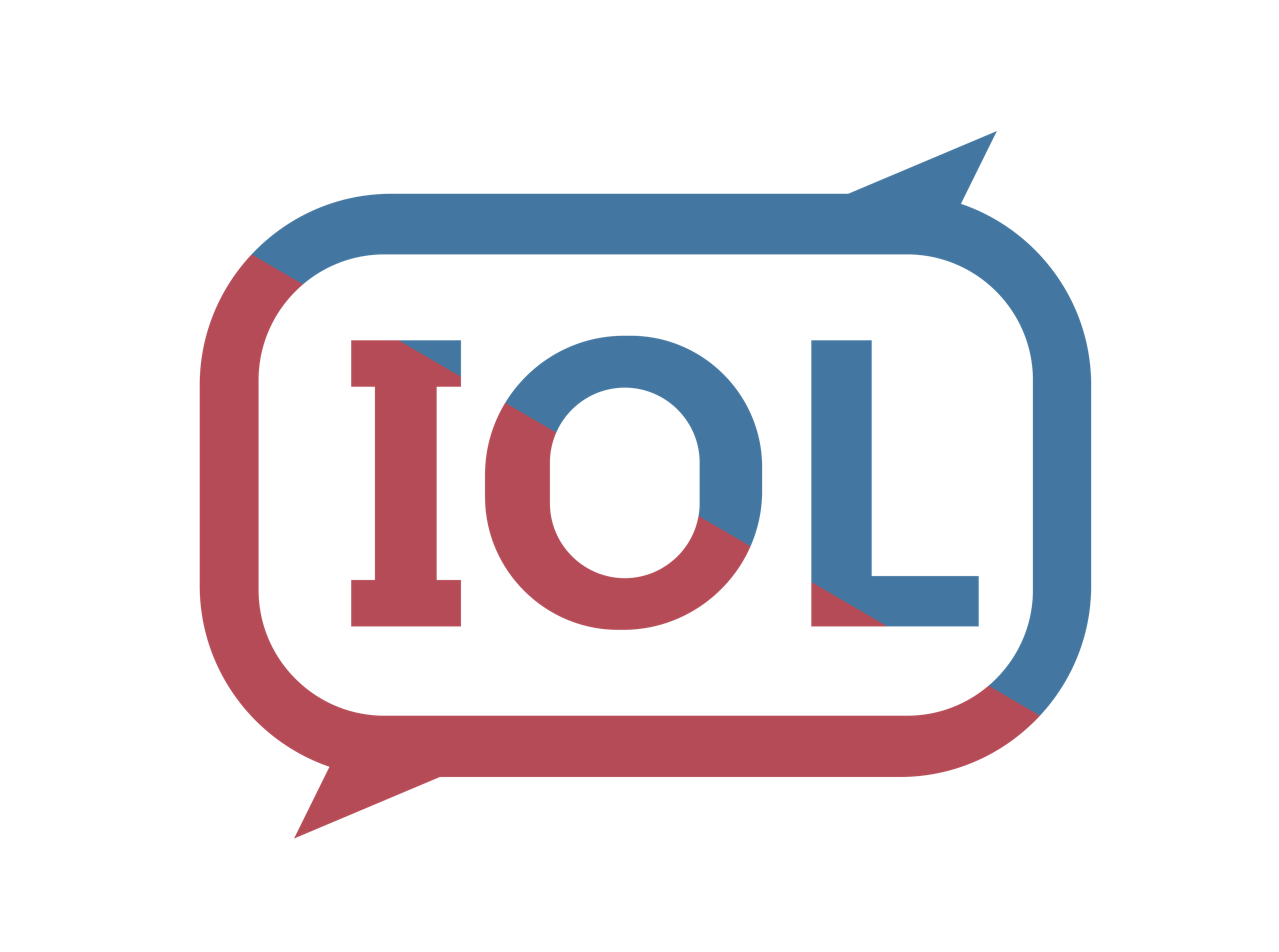
The logo of the International Linguistics Olympiad

The International Linguistics Olympiad (IOL) is а student competition for secondary school students from the International Science Olympiads. Its abbreviation, IOL, is deliberately chosen not to correspond to the name of the organization in any particular language so that member organizations can choose for themselves how to designate the competition in their own language. This olympiad furthers the fields of mathematical, theoretical, and descriptive linguistics.

== Format ==
The setup differs from most other Science Olympiads in that the olympiad contains both individual and team contests. The individual contest consists of five problems covering the main fields of theoretical, mathematical and applied linguistics — phonetics, morphology, semantics, syntax, sociolinguistics, etc. – which must be solved in six hours.

Since the second IOL, the team contest has consisted of one extremely difficult and time-consuming problem. Teams, which generally consist of four students, are given three to four hours to solve it.

Like nearly all International Science Olympiads, its problems are translated and completed in several languages and as such must be written free of any native language constraints. However, unlike other olympiads, the translations are provided by the multilingual Problem Committee, a body of experts independent of the delegates' team leaders. Because competitors could gain an advantage if they are familiar with the language groups that are the subject of some of the assignments, problems are increasingly based on some of the world's lesser-known languages. Fortunately, with over 6,000 languages spoken worldwide (not including the so-called dead languages), there are plenty to choose from. Artificial languages and writing systems have been used in previous problems, and certain problems have been based on patterned systems not usually considered language, such as mRNA or barcodes, further increasing the range of choice. The presence of an independent Problem Committee and Jury means that team leaders do not have to be experts in the field (though most are): they can (and often do) work closely with their teams, providing last-minute coaching throughout the week of the competition.

In any case, the most helpful ability is analytic and deductive thinking, as all solutions must include clear reasoning and justification.

== History ==
The concept of self-sufficient linguistics problems was formulated in the 1960s, in the intellectual environment of the recently founded Department of Theoretical and Applied Linguistics (OTiPL) of the Moscow State University. Moscow linguists in this environment were specially interested in understanding and modelling the formal and mathematical aspects of the natural languages; they were hatching things like the meaning-text theory, the Moscow School of Comparative Linguistics and the beginnings of what later became computational linguistics.

In 1963, Andrey Zaliznyak published a book called Linguistics problems (Лингвистические задачи), explaining in the introduction:

Specially crafted problems can serve as an important tool for teaching the fundamental principles and methods of linguistics. In existing collections, the material used for problems is often drawn from the facts of students' native language or the most well-known European languages. While such tasks are undoubtedly beneficial, they often suffer from the disadvantage that it is challenging to separate the linguistic task itself (which requires nothing but understanding the basic linguistic principles) from testing specific knowledge of the language under consideration. The best (though not the only) way to get rid of that second element, which doesn't directly relate to general linguistics, is to create tasks based on material from languages unfamiliar to the students. Of course, it is more challenging to craft such problems, since all the essential specific facts necessary for solving the task must somehow be presented in the problem data. However, in this case, students only need an understanding of the properties of language in general.

Following the publication, the then-student Alfred Zhurinsky proposed to the mathematics professor Vladimir Uspensky the creation of a high-school olympiad using such problems.

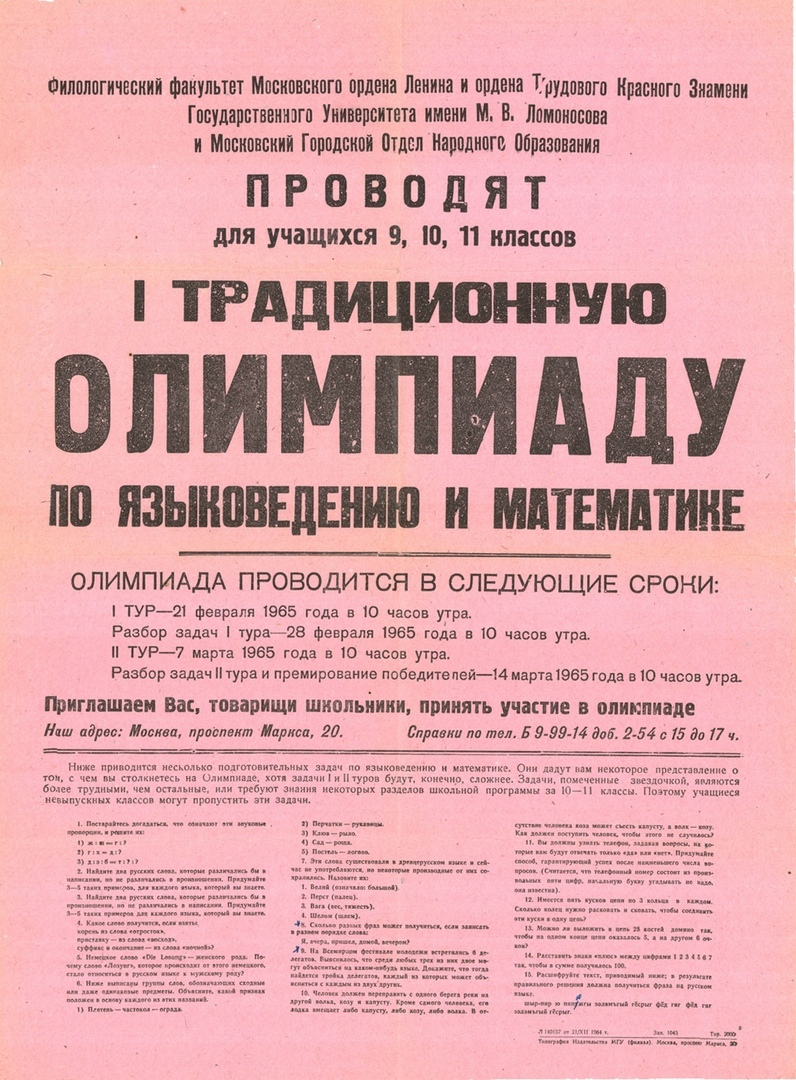
Poster of the First Traditional Olympiad on Linguistics, Moscow 1965

Thus, in 1965, the first edition of the Moscow's Traditional Olympiad on Linguistics and Mathematics was held, with an Organizing Committee composed of Uspensky (president), Igor Miloslavsky, Alexander Kibrik and Anna Polivanova. The Problem Committee consisted of Zhurinsky (the author of most of the problems) and Zaliznyak, plus Boris Gorodetsky (president), Alexandra Raskina and Victor Raskin. The Moscow Olympiad was held regularly until 1982 and resumed again in 1988, being still held nowadays.

In the next decades, olympiads using the format of self-sufficient linguistics problems started to appear in different regions:

- In 1984, professor Ruslan Mitkov founded the Bulgarian Olympiad of Mathematical Linguistics, open for high-school students of the whole Bulgaria. In this olympiad, each school could participate with 4 students, thus inspiring the format of the future IOL. From 2001, the Bulgarian Olympiad also started to feature a team competition.
- From 1988 to 2000, professor Thomas E. Payne from the University of Oregon organized a program with linguistics problems for high-school students in the city of Eugene, Oregon, United States. The format was very similar to the Moscow Olympiad, with which he had contact in 1986 when visiting the OTiPL in Moscow. From 2001 to 2006, the competition evolved into an online format, the Linguistics Challenge, which stimulated local linguistics competitions in different U.S. cities. This movement culminated in 2007 with the creation of the North American Computational Linguistics Open Competition.
- In 1995, a group of professors from the Saint Petersburg State University started to organize the Traditional Olympiad of Linguistics and Mathematics of Saint Petersburg, following a format very similar to that of the Moscow Olympiad. Decades later, in the 2010s, the olympiads of Moscow and Saint Petersburg merged to form a Russian National Linguistics Olympiad.
- In 2001, a group connected to the Leiden University, including Ruslan Mitkov, the founder of the Bulgarian Olympiad, and two other former participants of the Moscow Olympiad (Alexander Lubotsky participated from 1973 to 1976; Leonid Kulikov participated from 1981 to 1988), founded a Linguistics Olympiad for the Netherlands.

After the foundation of the Bulgarian olympiad, teams of the Moscow Linguistic Olympiad's winners successfully competed in Bulgaria and vice versa, demonstrating good potential for international cooperation in the field. With the multiplication of initiatives, the organizers of the different olympiads decided to organize, in 2003, the First International Olympiad in Theoretical, Mathematical, and Applied Linguistics, with six participating countries:

- Russia, with one team from the Moscow Olympiad and another from the Saint Petersburg Olympiad;
- Bulgaria, also with two teams, both from the Bulgarian Olympiad;
- Netherlands, with a team selected from its newly formed olympiad;
- Estonia, with a team from the olympiad organized in the same year by Renate Pajusalu and other professors from Tartu University;
- Latvia, with a team of students from Riga's Secondary School No. 40, the former school of Alexander Berdichevsky, then a master student at the OTiPL;
- Czech Republic, with a guest team.

== Contests, year by year ==
=== IOL 2003 ===
The first edition of IOL then was realized from September 6 to 12, 2003, in the mountain resort Borovetz, Bulgaria, chaired by Alexander Kibrik from Moscow State University (MSU) and with the participation of six countries: Bulgaria, Czech Republic, Estonia, Latvia, Netherlands, and Russia.

The first International Jury was composed of four people: Ivan Derzhanski (president) (Institute for Mathematics and Informatics of Bulgarian Academy of Sciences), Alexander Berdichevsky (MSU), Boris Iomdin (Russian Language Institute) and Elena Muravenko (Department for Russian Language, Russian State University for the Humanities).

The five problems at the individual contest concerned Jacob Linzbach's "Transcendental algebra" writing system, Egyptian Arabic (Afroasiatic), Basque (isolate), Adyghe (Northwest Caucasian), and French (Indo-European). The team contest consisted of three problems: on Tocharian (Indo-European), the use of subscripts as indices, and on performative verbs.

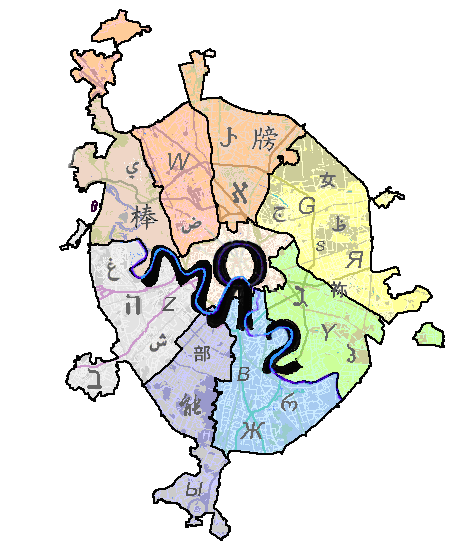
Logo of the Second International Linguistics Olympiad (2004), depicting a map of Moscow where each neighborhood (rayon) is marked with a letter in some writing system and the acronym МОЛ-2 (the Cyrillic acronym for 2nd IOL) follows the moskva river.

=== IOL 2004 ===
The 2nd IOL was held from August 2 to 6, 2004, in the Russian State University for the Humanities (RSUH), in Moscow, Russia. Chaired by Vladimir Alpatov, it gathered seven countries, with the first participation of Poland and Serbia and Montenegro.

The Problem Committee was chaired by Elena Muravenko. In addition to Berdichevsky, Derzhanski, and Iomdin, it also included Ksenia Gilyarova and Maria Rubinstein, both from the Russian State University for the Humanities.

The five problems at the individual contest were in Kayapo (Macro-Jê), Latin, English, Lakhota (Siouan) and Chuvash (Turkic). The team problem was in Armenian (Indo-European).

=== IOL 2005 ===
The 3rd IOL was held from August 8 to 12, 2005, at Leiden University, Leiden, Netherlands. Organized by a Local Committee composed by Alexander Lubotsky, Michiel de Vaan, Alwin Kloekhorst, Jesca Zweijtzer and Saskia Tiethoff, it had the participation of 13 teams from 9 countries, Finland and Romania for their first time. The Problem Committee was chaired by Ksenia Gilyarova.

The five problems at the individual contest concerned syntax in Tzotzil (Mayan), semantics in Lango (Nilotic), numbers in Mansi (Uralic), possessives in Yoruba (Atlantic–Congo) and accents in Lithuanian (Baltic). The team problem was in Figuig (Berber).

=== IOL 2006 ===
The 4th IOL was held from August 1 to 6, 2006, at the University of Tartu, Tartu, Estonia. Chaired by Renate Pajusalu, it received also 13 teams from 9 countries, with Lithuania sending a team for the first time. The Problem Committee was chaired by Alexander Berdichevsky.

The five problems at the individual contest were in Lakhota (Siouan) syntax, Catalan (Romanic) plural forms, Khmer (Austroasiatic) script, Udihe (Tungusic) possessives and Ngoni (Bantu) syntax. The team problem was in American Sign Language.

=== IOL 2007 ===
The 5th IOL was held from July 31 to August 4, 2007, at the Hotel Gelios, Saint Petersburg, Russia. Chaired by Stanislav Gurevich, it received 15 teams from 9 countries; Spain, Sweden and the United States came for the first time. With the participation of the US, it was the first time that English language was one of the languages of the competition. The Problem Committee was chaired by Dmitry Gerasimov; with the participation of Alexander Piperski, it was the first time the Jury had a former IOL participant as a member.

The five problems at the individual contest were in Braille, Movima (isolate), Georgian (Kartvelian), Ndom (Trans-New Guinea), and correspondences between Turkish and Tatar (both Turkic). The team problem was in Hawaiian (Polynesian) and focused on genealogical terms.

In that year, it was decided that each country can send one or two teams, consisting of four students each, with the first team's costs fully covered by the host country. Also, the host country could send a third team. This was also the year that the special trophy "Blue Vase" was introduced, as a special prize for the team with the highest average score in the individual competition.

=== IOL 2008 ===
The 6th IOL was held from August 4 to 9, 2008, at the Sunny Beach Resort, Sunny Beach, Bulgaria. Chaired by Iliana Raeva, it gathered 16 teams from 11 countries, including the first time for Germany, Slovenia and South Korea. The Problem Committee was chaired by Ivan Derzhanski.

The five individual problems were in Micmac (Algonquian), Old Norse (North Germanic) poetry (specifically, drottkvætt), Drehu and Cemuhî correspondences (Oceanic), Copainalá Zoque (Mixe-Zoquean), and Inuktitut (Eskimo-Aleut). The team problem was about correspondences between Mandarin and Cantonese (Sinitic) using the fanqie system.

=== IOL 2009 ===
The 7th IOL was held from July 26 to 31, 2009, at the University of Wrocław, Wrocław, Poland. Chaired by Michał Śliwiński, it received 23 teams from 17 countries, with Australia, United Kingdom, India and Ireland sending teams for the first time. The Problem Committee was chaired by Todor Tchervenkov (University of Lyon, France).

The subject matter of the five individual problems covered: numerals in the Sulka language (Isolate), Maninka and Bamana (Mande) languages in the N'Ko and Latin scripts, traditional Burmese (Sino-Tibetan) names and their relation with dates of birth, stress position in Old Indic (Indo-Aryan) and the relation between grammar and morphology in classical Nahuatl (Uto-Aztecan). The team problem was in Vietnamese (Austroasiatic).

This was the first year when the IOL received its Constitution.

=== IOL 2010 ===
The 8th IOL was held from July 19 to 24, 2010, at Östra Real Hostel, Stockholm, Sweden. Chaired by Hedvig Skigård, it received 26 teams from 18 countries, including first time for Norway and Singapore. The Problem Committee was chaired by Alexander Piperski (then recently graduated from MSU).

The individual contest consisted of five problems covering: relations between various verb forms in Budukh (Northeast Caucasian), the Drehu (Oceanic) counting system, Blissymbolics, mRNA coding, and the connection between Sursilvan and Engadine dialects in Romansh (Western Romance). The team problem involved translating extracts from a monolingual Mongolian (Mongolic) dictionary.

=== IOL 2011 ===
The 9th IOL was held from July 25 to 30, 2011, at the Carnegie Mellon University, Pittsburgh, USA – for the first time outside of Europe. Chaired by Lori Levin, it received 27 teams from 19 countries, including Brazil, Canada, United Arab Emirates and Vietnam for the first time. The Problem Committee was chaired by Adam Hesterberg (then recently graduated from Princeton University).

The problems of the individual contest required reasoning about Faroese (Germanic) orthography, Menominee (Algic) morphology, Vai (Mande) syntax, Nahuatl (Uto-Aztecan) semantics and the structure of the barcode language EAN-13. The team contest involved the rules and structure of Sanskrit (Indo-Aryan) poetry.

In the program of the event, this was the first time when there was a Jeopardy-style informal competition, organized by the USA team leader Dragomir R. Radev.

=== IOL 2012 ===
The 10th IOL was held from July 29 to August 4, 2012, at the University of Ljubljana, Ljubljana, Slovenia. Chaired by Mirko Vaupotič, it received 34 teams from 26 countries, first time for China, Greece, Hungary, Israel and Japan. The Problem Committee was chaired by Ivan Derzhanski.

The five problems at the individual contest were in Dyirbal (Pama-Nyungan) syntax, Umbu-Ungu (Trans-New Guinea) numbers, Basque (Isolate) pronouns, Teop (Austronesian) syntax, and Rotuman (Austronesian) semantics. The team problem involved recognizing country names in Lao language (Tai-Kadai).

=== IOL 2013 ===
The 11th IOL was held from July 22 to 26, 2013, at the Manchester Grammar School, Manchester, UK. Chaired by Neil Sheldon, it received 35 teams from 26 countries, including first time teams from Isle of Man, Taiwan and Turkey. The Problem Committee was chaired by Stanislav Gurevich.

The five problems at the individual contest were about Yidiny (Pama-Nyungan) morphology, Tundra Yukaghir (Yukhagir) semantics, Pirahã (Mura) phonology, Muna (Austronesian) syntax, and telepathy based on English. The team problem involved translating Martin Seymour-Smith's list of the 100 most influential books from Georgian (Kartvelian) written in the 9th century Nuskhuri script.

=== IOL 2014 ===
The 12th IOL was held from July 21 to 25, 2014, at the Beijing Language and Culture University, Beijing, China – for the first time on the Asian continent. Chaired by Jiang Yuqin, it received 39 teams from 28 countries, with Pakistan and Ukraine sending teams for the first time. The Problem Committee was chaired by Tae Hun Lee.

The five problems at the individual contest were about Benabena (Trans-New Guinea) morphology, Kiowa (Tanoan) morphophonology, Tangut (Tibeto-Burman) kinship, Engenni (Niger-Congo) syntax, and Gbaya (Niger-Congo). The team problem involved matching the articles of the Universal Declaration of Human Rights to their translations in Armenian (Indo-European).

=== IOL 2015 ===
The 13th IOL was held from July 20 to 24, 2015, at the American University in Bulgaria, Blagoevgrad, Bulgaria. Chaired by Aleksandar Velinov, it received 43 teams from 29 countries, with Bangladesh, France and Kazakhstan sending teams for the first time. The Problem Committee was chaired by Bozhidar Bozhanov.

The five problems at the individual contest were about Nahuatl (Uto-Aztecan) and Arammba (South-Central Papuan) numbers, morphology in the Besleney dialect of Kabardian (Abkhaz-Adyghe), Soundex, Wambaya (West Barkly) syntax and the rules of Somali (Afroasiatic) poetry. The team problem involved using extracts from a monolingual Northern Sotho (Bantu) dictionary to build a grammar and lexicon of the language.

This was the year when the current IOL official logo was chosen through the IOL Logo Competition. The winning design was done by Agata Łazarewicz of the Secondary Technical School of Electronics in Jelenia Góra, Poland.

=== IOL 2016 ===
The 14th IOL was held from July 25 to 29, 2016, at the Infosys Development Center in Mysore, India – for the second time on the Asian continent. Chaired by Dr. Monojit Choudhury and Dr. Girish Nath Jha, it received 44 teams from 31 countries, with Nepal and Sri Lanka sending teams for the first time. The Problem Committee was chaired by Boris Iomdin.

The five problems at the individual contest were about spatial deictics in Aralle-Tabulahan (Austronesian), Luwian hieroglyphic script (Indo-European), Kunuz Nubian (Eastern Sudanic) morphosyntax, Iatmül (Sepik) semantics and Jaqaru (Aymaran) morphology. The team problem involved matching over 100 utterances in Taa (Tuu) to their IPA transcriptions.

=== IOL 2017 ===
The 15th IOL was held from July 31 to August 4, 2017, at Dublin City University in Dublin, Ireland. Chaired by Dr. Cara Greene, it received 43 teams from 27 countries, with Canada sending a Francophone team for the first time. The Problem Committee was chaired by Hugh Dobbs.

The five problems at the individual content were about Berom (Plateau) numbers, Abui (Timor-Alor-Pantar) possessives and semantics, Kimbundu (Bantu) morphosyntax, Jru' (Austroasiatic) written in the Khom script and Madak (Meso-Melanesian) morphophonology. The team problem involved establishing correspondences between 87 emojis and their descriptions in Indonesian (Austronesian).

=== IOL 2018 ===
The 16th IOL was held from July 26 to 30, 2018, at the Czech University of Life Sciences in Prague, Czech Republic. Chaired by Vojtěch Diatka, it received 49 teams from 29 countries, with Malaysia and Denmark competing for the first time. The Problem Committee was chaired by Maria Rubinstein.

The five problems at the individual contest concerned Creek (Muskogean) stress, Hakhun (Sal) morphosyntax, Terêna (Arawakan) phonology, counting in Mountain Arapesh (Torricelli) and kinship in Akan (Atlantic-Congo). The team problem examined phonological correspondences among the three Jê languages Mẽbêngôkre, Xavante and Krĩkatí.

=== IOL 2019 ===
The 17th IOL was held from July 29 to August 2, 2019, at the Hankuk University of Foreign Studies in Yongin, South Korea. Chaired by Minkyu Kim and Yoojung Chae, it received 53 teams from 35 countries, with Hong Kong, Uzbekistan and Colombia competing for the first time. The Problem Committee was chaired by Tae Hun Lee.

The five problems at the individual contest concerned Yonggom (Ok) morphosyntax, Yurok (Algic) colours, Middle Persian (Iranian) written in Book Pahlavi script, West Tarangan (Aru) reduplication and Nooni (Beboid) morphosyntax and day names. The team problem involved the symbol notation used by judges in rhythmic gymnastics.

This edition, the third in Asia, marked an expansion in the participation of Asian countries. It was also the first edition of the Asia Pacific Linguistics Olympiad (APLO).

At IOL, it was the year the IOL flag was introduced, and also the first year when there was a body of International Volunteers helping organize the event.

=== IOL 2021 ===
The 18th IOL was scheduled to take place from July 20 to 24, 2020, in Ventspils, Latvia. Due to the widespread COVID-19 pandemic, the International Board of the IOL decided to postpone the event to July 19 to 23, 2021, on which it was successfully held. The competition was held remotely in the respective countries of each team, the first and so far only time that this mode of competition was adopted at the IOL. Chaired by Vladimir Litvinsky, it received 54 teams from 34 countries, with Azerbaijan competing for the first time. The Problem Committee was chaired by Aleksejs Peguševs.

The five problems at the individual contest concerned Ekari (Paniai Lakes) numerals, Zuni (Isolate) semantics with special focus on food, Kilivila (Oceanic) morphosyntax, Agbirigba (a cant language) and its derivation from the Ogbakiri dialect of Ikwerre (Atlantic-Congo), and Rikbaktsa (Macro-Jê) morphology. The team problem involved matching sentences in passages written in Garifuna (Arawakan) with its translations, as well as acknowledging the difference between the language's male and female registers and establishing their relationships with Kari'ña (Cariban) and Lokono (Arawakan), respectively.

=== IOL 2022 ===
The 19th IOL was held from July 25 to 29, 2022, at King William's College in Castletown, Isle of Man. Chaired by Rob Teare, it received 46 teams from 32 countries, with Moldova, Switzerland and Thailand competing for the first time. The Problem Committee was chaired by Samuel K. Ahmed (University of Amsterdam).

The five problems at the individual contest concerned Ubykh (Abkhaz-Adyghe) morphophonology, the semantics and morphophonology of Alabama (Muskogean) verbs, Nǀuuki (Tuu) syntax, Arabana (Pama-Nyungan) kinship, and phonological changes and tonogenesis in two daughter languages of Proto-Chamic, Phan Rang Cham and Tsat. The team problem presented extracts in 17th and 18th century Manchu (Tungusic) from Cheong-eo Nogeoldae and the Kangxi Emperor's Imperially Commissioned Mirror of the Manchu Language for analysis, with tasks involving matching sentences in Old and Modern Manchu to their respective translations as well as writing in the Manchu script.

=== IOL 2023 ===
The 20th IOL was held from July 24 to 28, 2023, in Bansko, Bulgaria, for the fourth time in this country. Chaired by Aleksandar Velinov, it received 51 teams from 37 countries, with Philippines competing for the first time. The Problem Committee was chaired by Milena Veneva.

The five problems at the individual contest concerned Guazacapán Xinka (a language of Guatemala with now no living native speakers), Apurinã (Arawak) morphosyntax, Coastal Marind (Papuan) morphosyntax, Plains Cree (Algonquian) verb morphology and the numbering system of Supyire spoken in Mali. The team problem presented extracts from Chester S. Street's dictionary of Murrin-patha, an Australian Aboriginal language spoken by over 2,000 people in the Northern Territory.

=== IOL 2024 ===
The 21st IOL was held from July 23 to 31, 2024, at the Universidade de Brasília, Brasília, Brazil, which was the first time the contest was held in the southern hemisphere. Chaired by Bruno L'Astorina, it received 206 contestants in 52 teams from 38 countries, with Iran and Malta competing for the first time. The Problem Committee was chaired by Andrey Nikulin (Universidade Federal de Goiás).

The five problems at the individual contest concerned verbal forms in Koryak (Chukotko–Kamchatkan), noun phrases in Hadza (isolate), kinship terms in Kómnzo (Yam), semantics in Dâw (Naduhup), and male-female diglossia in Yanyuwa (Pama–Nyungan). The team problem involved lexicostatistics, Dolgopolsky's consonant classes, and the "StarlingNJ" algorithm to compute language family trees and stability indices based on lexicostatistical distance.

This was the year when the IOL programme was extended from five to seven full days, after the successful addition of two "Friendship days" in Bansko 2023 (later editions had six to seven days of programme). This edition also included a simultaneous three-day capacitation program in linguistics for local Brazilian school teachers, as well as a special session for the participants involving editions in Wikidata, the Wikidata IOLab. Finally, this was the year when the "Students Oath" was formally introduced.

=== IOL 2025 ===
The 22nd IOL was held from July 20 to 27, 2025, at National Taiwan University in Taipei, Taiwan. Chaired by Chenhao Chiu, it received 227 contestants in 57 teams from 43 countries and territories, with Greece and Macau sending teams for the first time. The Problem Committee was chaired by Tung-Le Pan.

The five problems at the individual contest concerned number systems in Dzongkha (Sino-Tibetan), possessives in Gaahmg (Eastern Sudanic), verbal forms in Kuria (Great Lakes Bantu), semantics in Kewa (Trans-New Guinea) and psycholinguistic analysis in Kaqchikel (Mayan). The team problem involved comparing verbal forms in Camling and Bantawa, languages from the Kiranti branch of the Sino-Tibetan languages, spoken in Nepal.

=== IOL 2026 ===
The 23rd IOL was held from July 26 to August 2, 2026, at the Faculty of Law at the University of Bucharest in Bucharest, Romania. Chaired by Paul Helmer, it received 255 contestants from 65 teams from 46 countries and territories, with Austria sending a team for the first time. The Problem Committee was chaired by Dan-Mircea Mirea.

The five problems at the individual contest concerned the phonology of Central Alaskan Yup'ik (Eskimo-Aleut), color terms in Yélî Dnye (unclassified), syntax of Iquito (Zaparoan), kinship terms in Sakurabiat (Tupian), and verb phrases in Komnzo (Yam). The team problem involved the translation of the story of Don Crescencio in Teotitlán del Valle Zapotec of the Oto-Manguean family, spoken in Mexico.

=== IOL 2027 ===
The 24th IOL has been selected to be held in Bangkok, Thailand, in late July 2027.

== Summary ==
The different editions of IOL can be summarized in the following table:

No.	Year	Host city	IOL territory	Dates		Countries	Participants	Webpage	Problems
1	2003	Borovets	Bulgaria	September 6	September 12	6	33	Link	Link
2	2004	Moscow	Russia	July 31	August 2	7	43	Link	Link
3	2005	Leiden	Netherlands	August 8	August 12	9	50	Link	Link
4	2006	Tartu	Estonia	August 1	August 6	9	51	Link	Link
5	2007	Saint Petersburg	Russia	July 31	August 4	9	61	Link	Link
6	2008	Sunny Beach	Bulgaria	August 4	August 9	11	63	Link	Link
7	2009	Wrocław	Poland	July 26	July 31	17	86	Link	Link
8	2010	Stockholm	Sweden	July 19	July 24	18	99	Link	Link
9	2011	Pittsburgh	United States	July 24	July 30	19	102	Link	Link
10	2012	Ljubljana	Slovenia	July 29	August 4	26	131	Link	Link
11	2013	Manchester	United Kingdom	July 22	July 26	26	138	Link	Link
12	2014	Beijing	China	July 21	July 25	28	152	Link	Link
13	2015	Blagoevgrad	Bulgaria	July 20	July 24	29	166	Link	Link
14	2016	Mysore	India	July 25	July 29	31	167	Link	Link
15	2017	Dublin	Ireland	July 31	August 4	29	180	Link	Link
16	2018	Prague	Czech Republic	July 25	July 31	29	192	Link	Link
17	2019	Yongin	South Korea	July 29	August 2	35	209	Link	Link
–	2020	Ventspils	Latvia	Cancelled due to the COVID-19 pandemic					
18	2021	Ventspils	Latvia^{1}	July 19	July 23	34	216	Link	Link
19	2022	Castletown	Isle of Man	July 25	July 29	32	185	Link	Link
20	2023	Bansko	Bulgaria	July 24	July 28	37	204	Link	Link
21	2024	Brasília	Brazil	July 23	July 31	38	206	Link	Link
22	2025	Taipei	Taiwan	July 21	July 26	38	227	Link	Link
23	2026	Bucharest	Romania	July 26	August 2	46	255	Link	Link
24	2027	Bangkok	Thailand					Link	

1. ^{a} The competition was held remotely.

== Participant countries ==
Countries ever participating in the IOL (as of 2025) Hosts (minimum once) Participants

Like most International Science Olympiads, participation at IOL occurs as delegations from participating countries, usually selected as finalists in National Linguistics Olympiads. However, the concept of "country or territory" at IOL is not straightforwardly the usual concept. The Constitution of IOL writes:

Under exceptional circumstances, two or more entities (“territories”) from the same country may apply to the International Board to be permitted to send separate teams to the IOL. As a guideline, the following are examples of the conditions under which such a request may be considered, but the final decision rests with the International Board:

- The different territories are recognised as separate “countries” by other acknowledged bodies, including those for other competitions (e.g. educational or sporting).
- The different territories have separate and independent governments or education systems, with independent Education Ministries, or potential funding bodies which treat the different territories separately.
- The different territories have a historical linguistic divergence which makes participation under the “one language per team” rule difficult or impossible.

Notably, Canada competes under two different territories: Canada Francophone and Canada Anglophone – the former having its own national olympiad in French while the latter participating in the English-based North American Computational Linguistics Open Competition (NACLO). The Isle of Man also participates as a different territory from UK and Taiwan, Hong Kong and Macau, as different territories from China team.

The current list of accredited countries, i.e. countries that have national olympiads abiding some basic rules, consists of: Australia, Brazil, Bulgaria, Canada Anglophone, Canada Francophone, China, Colombia, Czech Republic, Estonia, Finland, Germany, Greece, Hong Kong, Hungary, India, Iran, Ireland, Isle of Man, Israel, Japan, Kazakhstan, Latvia, Macau, Malaysia, Malta, Moldova, Nepal, Netherlands, Philippines, Poland, Romania, Russia (under the name Belka), Singapore, Slovenia, South Korea, Spain, Sweden, Switzerland, Taiwan, Thailand, Ukraine, United Kingdom and United States of America.

Other than those, there are also countries that participated at IOL before, either with ad hoc teams or having organized a national olympiad no longer active, that are not currently accredited. These include Azerbaijan, Bangladesh, Denmark, France, Lithuania, Norway, Pakistan, Serbia, Sri Lanka, Turkey, United Arab Emirates, Uzbekistan and Vietnam.

== Individual medalists ==
Year	Location	Gold	Silver	Bronze
2003	Borovets, Bulgaria	Alexandra Petrova (Russia) Boris Turovsky (Russia); Eddin Najetović (Netherlands)	Mirjam Plooij (Netherlands) Maria Skhapa (Russia)	Polina Oskolskaya (Russia) Ivan Dobrev (Bulgaria)
2004	Moscow, Russia	Ivan Dobrev (Bulgaria) Alexander Piperski (Russia); Ralitsa Markova (Bulgaria)	Maria Mamykina (Russia) Todor Chervenkov (Bulgaria); Tsvetomila Mihaylova (Bulgaria); Tymon Słoczyński (Poland)	Alexandra Zabelina (Russia) Xenia Kuzmina (Russia); Alexei Nazarov (Netherlands); Margus Niitsoo (Estonia); Natalja Hartsenko (Estonia); Nikita Medyankin (Russia); Sophia Oskolskaya (Russia)
2005	Leiden, Netherlands	Ivan Dobrev (Bulgaria)	Eleonora Glazova (Russia)	Nikita Medyankin (Russia) Tsvetomila Mihaylova (Bulgaria); Alexander Piperski (Russia); Ivaylo Grozdev (Bulgaria)
2006	Tartu, Estonia	Maria Kholodilova (Russia) Ivaylo Dimitrov (Bulgaria); Pavel Sofroniev (Bulgaria)	Yordan Mehandzhiyski (Bulgaria) Eleonora Glazova (Russia); Mihail Minkov (Bulgaria); Daniil Zorin (Russia); Sergey Malyshev (Russia); Alexander Daskalov (Bulgaria)	Yuliya Taran (Russia) Nikita Medyankin (Russia); Diana Aitai (Estonia); Paweł Świątkowski (Poland)
2007	Saint Petersburg, Russia	Adam Hesterberg (United States) Łukasz Cegieła (Poland)	Kira Kiranova (Russia) Mihail Minkov (Bulgaria); Arseniy Vetushko-Kalevich (Russia); Sander Pajusalu (Estonia); Teele Vaalma (Estonia); Angel Naydenov (Bulgaria)	Anna Shlomina (Russia) Yordan Mehandzhiyski (Bulgaria); Elizaveta Rebrova (Russia); Maria Kholodilova (Russia)
2008	Sunny Beach, Bulgaria	Alexander Daskalov (Bulgaria) Hanzhi Zhu (United States); Milan Abel Lopuhaa (Netherlands)	Anand Natarajan (United States) Maciej Janicki (Poland); Morris Alper (United States); Dmitry Perevozchikov (Russia); Łukasz Cegieła (Poland); Andrey Nikulin (Russia); Marcin Filar (Poland)	Guy Tabachnick (United States) Joon Kyu Kang (South Korea); Radosław Burny (Poland); Diana Sofronieva (Bulgaria); Jeffrey Lim (United States); Karol Konaszyński (Poland); Yordan Mehandzhiyski (Bulgaria); Rebecca Jacobs (United States); Tatyana Polevaya (Russia); Georgi Rangelov (Bulgaria)
2009	Wrocław, Poland	Diana Sofronieva (Bulgaria) Łukasz Cegieła (Poland)	Vitaly Pavlenko (Russia) Andrey Nikulin (Russia); Yordan Mehandzhiyski (Bulgaria); Arturs Semenyuks (Latvia); Irene Tamm (Estonia); Łukasz Kalinowski (Poland); Witold Małecki (Poland); Aakanksha Sarda (India); Rebecca Jacobs (United States)	Deyana Kamburova (Bulgaria) Szymon Musioł (Poland); Elena Volkova (Russia); Laura Adamson (Estonia); Alan Huang (United States); Ben Caller (United Kingdom); Tomasz Dobrzycki (Poland); John Berman (United States); Jun Yeop Lee (South Korea); Sergei Bernstein (United States); Hye Jin Ryu (South Korea)
2010	Stockholm, Sweden	Vadim Tukh (Russia) Andrey Nikulin (Russia); Ben Sklaroff (United States)	Martin Camacho (United States) Tian-Yi Damien Jiang (United States); Daria Vasilyeva (Russia); Allen Yuan (United States); Aleksejs Peguševs (Latvia); Łukasz Kalinowski (Poland); Krzysztof Pawlak (Poland); Daniel Rucki (Poland); Maciej Dulęba (Poland)	Mirjam Parve (Estonia) Miroslav Manolov (Bulgaria); Alexander Iriza (United States); Alan Chang (United States); Vitaly Pavlenko (Russia); Artūrs Semeņuks (Latvia); Mona Teppor (Estonia); Jakob Park (Germany); Diana Glazova (Russia); Szymon Kanonowicz (Poland); Roman Stasiński (Poland); Ellen Sinot (Netherlands); Younus Porteous (United Kingdom); Ana Pavlović (Serbia); Song Jeeun (South Korea)
2011	Pittsburgh, USA (United States)	Morris Alper (United States) Eva-Lotta Käsper (Estonia); Daria Vasilyeva (Russia); Aleksey Kozlov (Russia)	Wesley Jones (United States) Allen Yuan (United States); Jekaterina Malina (Latvia); Anton Sokolov (Russia); Alexander Wade (United States); Victor Valov (Bulgaria); Duligur Ibeling (United States); Paul Lau (Australia)	Min Kyu Kim (South Korea) Elena Rykunova (Russia); Artūrs Semeņuks (Latvia); Hyun Park (South Korea); Rok Kaufman (Slovenia); Vadim Tukh (Russia); Daniel Mitropolsky (Canada); Nik Moore (United Kingdom); Daniel Rucki (Poland); Aaron Klein (United States); Dimitar Hristov (Bulgaria); Mihhail Afanasjev (Estonia); Ralf Ahi (Estonia)
2012	Ljubljana, Slovenia	Anton Sokolov (Russia) Alexander Wade (United States); Vadim Tukh (Russia); Anderson Wang (United States); Konrad Myszkowski (Poland); Jonathan Hongsoon Kim (South Korea); Marin Ivanov (Bulgaria); Kristian Kostadinov (Bulgaria)	Darryl Wu (United States) Allan Sadun (United States); Eva-Lotta Käsper (Estonia); Tom White (United Kingdom); Daniel Rucki (Poland); Aaron Klein (United States); Max Allmendinger (Germany); Ilya Pogodaev (Russia); Ivan Tadeu Ferreira Antunes Filho (Brazil); Rok Kaufman (Slovenia); Hong Bum Choi (South Korea); Ji Wook Kim (South Korea); Sagar Sarda (India)	Pedro Neves Lopes (Brazil) Erik Andersen (United States); Magdalena Dakeva (Bulgaria); Ants-Oskar Mäesalu (Estonia); Omri Faraggi (United Kingdom); Anna Sarukhanova (Russia); Melanie Duncan (United Kingdom); Baichuan Li (United Kingdom); Anita Mudzhumdar (Russia); Estere Šeinkmane (Latvia); Yash Sinha (India); Amelia Shaye Lim Jin (Singapore); Edyta Gajdzik (Poland); Mette-Triin Purde (Estonia); Erik Tamre (Estonia); Anne Ng Yin-Yi (Singapore)
2013	Manchester, UK (United Kingdom)	Alexander Wade (United States) Anton Sokolov (Russia); Matyas Medek (Czech Republic); Gabriel Alves da Silva Diniz (Brazil); Michał Hadryś (Poland); Iva Gumnishka (Bulgaria); Estere Šeinkmane (Latvia)	Omri Faraggi (United Kingdom) Yash Sinha (India); Polina Pleshak (Russia); Kuzma Smirnov (Russia); Martyna Siejba (Poland); Aaron Klein (United States); Airika Arrik (Estonia); Boryana Hadzhiyska (Bulgaria); Ivan Zverev (Russia); Huisu Yun (South Korea); Jeffrey Ling (United States); Yulia Markova (Bulgaria)	Nilai Sarda (India) Vesko Milev (Bulgaria); Marin Ivanov (Bulgaria); Ivan Lyutskanov (Bulgaria); Jacob Karlsson Lagerros (Sweden); Tom McCoy (United States); Martyna Judd (Australia); Ants-Oskar Mäesalu (Estonia); Milena Velikova (Bulgaria); Jeong Yeon Choi (South Korea); Ekaterina Novikova (Russia); Maciej Kucharski (Poland); Daniel Lovsted (Canada); Maximilian Schindler (United States); Jiyun Sung (South Korea); Sarah Tham (Singapore); Jan Bajer (Poland)
2014	Beijing, China	Milo Andrea Mazurkiewicz (Poland) Darryl Wu (United States); Daniel Lovsted (Canada); Elysia Warner (United Kingdom); Anastasiia Dmitrieva (Russia); Danila Shumskiy (Russia); Dan Mirea (Romania)	Ada Melentieva (Ukraine) Catherine Wu (United States); Chen Tianlu (China); Yan Huang (Canada); Alexander Babiak (United States); Zhang Ming (China); Lara Jerman (Slovenia); Chen Run (China); Keisuke Yamada (Japan); Stanisław Wilczyński (Poland); Felicia Lane (Sweden); Deven Lahoti (United States); Xue Dailin (China)	Anindya Sharma (India) Elena Chaparova (Bulgaria); Maciej Kocot (Poland); Matyáš Medek (Czech Republic); Rajan Dalal (India); Yoojin Jang (South Korea); Dmitrii Zelenskii (Russia); Annika Kluge (Estonia); Jonathan Johansen (Sweden); Kevin Li (United States); Gleb Nikolaev (Russia); James Bloxham (United States); James Abel (Australia); Yulia Markova (Bulgaria); Šonita Koroļova (Latvia); Eliška Freibergerová (Czech Republic); Yang Heran (China); Vitālijs Gusevs (Latvia); Glenn Ee Je Hong (Singapore); Simon Huang (Canada); Maria Aristova (Russia)
2015	Blagoevgrad, Bulgaria	James Wedgwood (United States) Samuel Ahmed (United Kingdom); James Bloxham (United States); Danail Penev (Bulgaria); Kevin Yang (United States); Eimear McKnight (United Kingdom); Ada Melentyeva (Ukraine)	Kevin M Li (United States) Ying Ming Poh (Singapore); Conor Stuart-Roe (United States); Valentin Dimov (Bulgaria); Daniil Vedeneev (Russia); Stanisław Frejlak (Poland); Jin Xu (China); Julian Gau (United States); Dan Mircea Mirea (Romania); Katarzyna Kowalska (Poland); Ralitza Dardjonova (Bulgaria); Anthony Bracey (United Kingdom); Ivan Oleksiyuk (Ukraine); Teodora-Elena Solovan (Romania); Jan Petr (Czech Republic); Ruowang Zhang (China); Tina Vladimirova (Bulgaria)	Bálint Ugrin (Hungary) Nilai Sarda (United States); Piotr Gajdzica (Poland); Zdravko Ivanov (Bulgaria); Anastasiia Alokhina (Ukraine); Pim Spelier (Netherlands); Naomi Solomons (United Kingdom); Anna Tatarenko (Russia); Jaeyeong Yang (South Korea); Aalok Sathe (India); Anthony Bruce Ma (Australia); Diana Murzagaliyeva (Kazakhstan); Luke Gardiner (Republic of Ireland); Nadezhda Dimitrova (Bulgaria); Radina Dobreva (Bulgaria); Emma McLean (Canada); Irina Česnokova (Latvia); Isabelle Yen (Taiwan); Matija Lovšin (Slovenia); Naoki Nishiyama (Japan); Samvida Sudheesh Venkatesh (India); Timurs Davilovs (Latvia)
2016	Mysore, India	Jaeyeong Yang (South Korea) James Wedgwood (United States); Eimear McKnight (United Kingdom); Max Zhang (Australia); Jan Petr (Czech Republic); Katya Voloshinova (Russia); Ivan Samodelkin (Russia); Kristian Georgiev (Bulgaria); Samuel Ahmed (United Kingdom); Polina Nasledskova (Russia)	Margarita Misirpashayeva (United States) Ioana Bouroș (Romania); Shuheng Nelson Niu (United States); Joonas Jürgen Kisel (Estonia); Zofia Kaczmarek (Poland); Tina Vladimirova (Bulgaria); Matija Lovšin (Slovenia); Luo Yiming (China); Krzysztof Choszczyk (Poland); Erik Metz (United States); Anna Tatarenko (Russia); Mihail Paskov (Bulgaria); Julia Panchenko (Russia); Shen-Chang Huang (Taiwan); Henry Wu (Australia); Maria Aristova (Russia); Maciej Paliga (Poland)	Tsuyoshi Kobayashi (Japan) Elena Shukshina (Russia); Daniel Vedeneev (Russia); Aalok Sathe (India); Wyatt Reeves (United States); Wang Runze (China); David Avellan-Hultman (Sweden); Bruno Ozaki (Brazil); Amanda Kann (Sweden); Agnieszka Dudek (Poland); Emil Ingelsten (Sweden); Bai Ruiheng (China); Zuzana Gruberová (Czech Republic); Yu Shuyue (China); Claire O'Connor (Republic of Ireland); Tsvetelina Stefanova (Bulgaria); Theodor Cucu (Romania); Li Huihan (China); Nadezhda Dimitrova (Bulgaria); Mazzag Bálint (Hungary); Wojciech Piątek (Poland); Siye Annie Zhu (United States); Mariia Stepaniuk (Ukraine); Roman Skurikhin (Ukraine); Isobel Voysey (United Kingdom); Yejoo Han (South Korea)
2017	Dublin, Ireland (Republic of Ireland)	Samuel Ahmed (United Kingdom) Przemysław Podleśny (Poland); Eimear McKnight (United Kingdom); Ruei Hung Alex Lee (Taiwan); Zdravko Ivanov (Bulgaria); Simeon Hellsten (United Kingdom); Brian Xiao (United States); Valentin Dimov (Bulgaria); Elena Keskinova (Bulgaria); Theodor Cucu (Romania)	Andrew Tockman (United States) Takumi Yoshino (Japan); Joonas Jürgen Kisel (Estonia); Jan Petr (Czech Republic); Harry Taylor (United Kingdom); Anja Zdovc (Slovenia); Eliška Freibergerová (Czech Republic); Paweł Piekarz (Poland); Tereza Maláčová (Czech Republic); Ben Morris (United Kingdom); Joseph Feffer (United States); Ziyan Heidi Lei (United States); Chih-Lun Julian Liu (Taiwan); Assel Ismoldayeva (Bulgaria); Chinmaya Kausik (India); Daniel Vedeneev (Russia); Szymon Stolarczyk (Poland); Yao Yung-Jui (Taiwan)	Ekaterina Voloshinova (Russia) Emil Indzhev (Bulgaria); Chirag C.D. (India); Iga Jaworska (Poland); Chen Ziche (China); Aleksei Starchenko (Russia); Ana Meta Dolinar (Slovenia); Siye Annie Zhu (United States); Emilian Toma (Romania); Can Yeşildere (Turkey); Sonia Reilly (United States); Alicja Maksymiuk (Poland); Emil Ingelsten (Sweden); Tanya Romanova (Russia); Ștefan Răzvan Bălăucă (Romania); Tina Vladimirova (Bulgaria); Matei Costin Banu (Romania); Yuito Yoneyama (Japan); Liu Yuyang (China); Nazar Semkiv (Ukraine); Aleksej Jurca (Slovenia); Martin Nikolov (Bulgaria)
2018	Prague, Czech Republic	Przemysław Podleśny (Poland) Eimear McKnight (United Kingdom); Swapnil Garg (United States); Viktor Baltin (Bulgaria); Zdravko Ivanov (Bulgaria); Benjamin LaFond (United States); Diego Król (Poland); Rujul Gandhi (India); Pranav Krishna (United States); Alicja Maksymiuk (Poland); Benedict Randall Shaw (United Kingdom); Angikar Ghosal (India); Andrew Tockman (United States)	Jakub Petr (Czech Republic) Chih-Chun Wang (Taiwan); Tanya Romanova (Russia); Mihir Singhal (United States); Yeoh Zi Song (Malaysia); Simeon Hellsten (United Kingdom); Ugrin Bálint József (Hungary); Emil Ingelsten (Sweden); Klara Sapała-Niedzin (Poland); Tung-Le Pan (Taiwan); Elena Keskinova (Bulgaria); Ethan A. Chi (United States); Aparna Ajit Gupte (India); João Henrique Oliveira Fontes (Brazil); Russell Emerine (United States); You-Kuan Lin (Taiwan); Illya Koval (Ukraine)	David Avellan-Hultman (Sweden) Vlada Petrusenko (Ukraine); Tsvetelina Stefanova (Bulgaria); Brian Xiao (United States); Ken Jiang (Canada); Ye Liu (China); Edmund Lea (United Kingdom); Hari Raghava Prasad (United Kingdom); James Phillips (Australia); Yana Shishkina (Russia); Gustavo Palote da Silva Martins (Brazil); Ekaterina Voloshinova (Russia); Eliška Freibergerová (Czech Republic); Sean White (United Kingdom); Vári-Kakas Andor (Hungary); Árvay-Vass Iván (Hungary); Takumi Nishino (Japan); Angellika Vojevodina (Latvia); Arkādijs Šaldovs (Latvia); Kevin Liang (Canada); Shinjini Ghosh (India); Bianca-Mihaela Gănescu (Romania); Pranava Dhar (India); Martin Puškin (Estonia); Hansol Pi (South Korea); Georgi Yotov (Bulgaria); Ziche Chen (China); Tiago Scholten (Netherlands); Kristina Vashpanova (Russia); Danyar Kasenov (Russia)
2019	Yongin, South Korea	Ken Jiang (Canada) Wesley Zhang (United States); Takumi Yoshino (Japan); Zdravko Ivanov (Bulgaria); Matey Petkov (Bulgaria); Haokun Wu (China); Sam Corner (United Kingdom); Simeon Hellsten (United Kingdom); Benedict Randall Shaw (United Kingdom); Andrew Tockman (United States)	Diego Król (Poland) João Henrique Fontes (Brazil); Ziyan Heidi Lei (United States); Tianqi Jiang (Canada); Elena Keskinova (Bulgaria); Jakub Petr (Czech Republic); Nathan Kim (Canada); Denis Korotchenko (Russia); Skyelar Raiti (United States); Russell Emerine (United States); Gustavo Palote (Brazil); Ishan Ganguly (India); Harrison Moore (United Kingdom); Tsvetelina Stefanova (Bulgaria); Maxim Barganov (Russia); Zi Song Yeoh (Malaysia); Jeremy Zhou (United States); Pranav Krishna (United States); Jinru Bai (China); Kristian Terlien (Netherlands); Daniel Turaev (United Kingdom)	Tatiana Romanova (Russia) Kövér Blanka (Hungary); Ekaterina Kozlova (Russia); Stanislava Khizhniakova (Russia); Wang, Chih-Chun (Taiwan); Vlada Petrusenko (Ukraine); Viktor Baltin (Bulgaria); Matei-Costin Banu (Romania); Ekaterina Kropanina (Russia); Angikar Ghosal (India); Aparna Ajit Gupte (India); Haenaem Oh (South Korea); Hant Mikit Kolk (Estonia); Takumi Ose (Japan); Tsubasa Takahashi (Japan); Dana Ospanova (Kazakhstan); Nestors Starostins (Latvia); Daria Kryvosheieva (Ukraine); Marko Ivanov (Bulgaria); Kilian Meissner (United Kingdom); Blaskovics Ákos (Hungary); Rok Tadej Brunšek (Slovenia); Zhe Ren Ooi (Malaysia); Alex Walker (United Kingdom); Kristina Vashpanova (Russia); Lanruo Xie (China); Antara Raaghavi Bhattacharya (India); Seonoo Kim (South Korea); Lee, Yu-Hsuan (Taiwan)
2021	Ventspils, Latvia	Roman Shabanov (Netherlands) Daria Kryvosheieva (Ukraine); Jonathan Huang (United States); Ritam Nag (India); Hibiki Sugawara (Japan); Jan Tryka (Poland); Takamichi Hoshii (Japan); Chun-Chi Lin (Taiwan); Antara Raaghavi Bhattacharya (India); Xie Lingrui (Hong Kong); Mihai-Alexandru Bratu (Romania); Elvira Ageeva (Russia)	Aleksandra Limonova (Russia) Tam Lok Hang (Hong Kong); Alexander Dimitrov (Bulgaria); Bartosz Chomiński (Poland); Aleksandra Naydenova (Bulgaria); Ip Tsz Oi (Hong Kong); Leonid Zaitsev (Russia); Toh Jing En Daniel (Singapore); Grigorii Solnyshkin (Russia); Artem Borisov (Russia); Nigel Yong (Singapore); Dylan Lim Chun Kiat (Singapore); Samantha Kao (Taiwan); Ema Grofová (Czech Republic); Miklós Gyetvai (Hungary); Zijing Wei (China); Olga Zinovyeva (Russia); Rio Ogawa (Japan); Walt Kraeger (Netherlands)	Lili Probojcsevity (Hungary) Shao-Chi Ou (Taiwan); Deyana Shevchenko (Bulgaria); Kunaal Chandrashekar (Canada); Olivia Tennisberg (Estonia); Jeremy Zhou (United States); Vedant Singh (India); Miłosz Muszyński (Poland); Riley Kong (United States); Ng Truman Toby (Hong Kong); Vasilena Lazarova (Bulgaria); Matic Petek (Slovenia); Mihaela Koleva (Bulgaria); Ilya Tarasov (Russia); Ivaylo Dimitrov (Bulgaria); Nicoleta Dobrică (Romania); Toby Collins (United Kingdom); Kyuhan Kyung (South Korea); Yi-Ning Chang (Taiwan); Louis Cho (Germany); Jonathan Song (United States); Bianca-Maria Crișan (Romania); Shashwat Mundra (India); Zekai Wu (China); Vishruth Ram Konakanchi (India); Daina Myer Neithardt (United States); Kent Do (Sweden); Oscar Despard (Republic of Ireland); Nestors Starostins (Latvia); Noah Gorrell (Australia); Yen-Hsi Huang (Taiwan); Darya Peressypkina (Kazakhstan); Yage Grace Xin (China)
2022	Castletown, Isle of Man	Artem Borisov Jun Hyeong Yook (South Korea); Alison Craig-Greene (United Kingdom); Luke Robitaille (United States); Aleksandar Dimitrov (Bulgaria); Konstantin Georgiev (Bulgaria); Mihai-Alexandru Bratu (Romania); Takamichi Hoshii (Japan); Seiko Ishii (Japan)	Tam Lok Hang (Hong Kong) Kunaal Chandrashekar (Canada); Vlad-Ștefan Oros (Romania); Riley Kong (United States); William Thomson (United Kingdom); Rishab Parthasarathy (United States); Benjamin McAvoy-Bickford (United States); Wojciech Szot (Poland); Gergana Petrova (Bulgaria); Daria Kryvosheieva (Ukraine); Bartłomiej Rozenberg (Poland); Long Yo Lee (Taiwan); George Zhou (United Kingdom); Yi Ning Chang (Taiwan); Yelyzaveta Sherepenko (Ukraine); Merlin Fischer (Germany); Fernando César Gonçalves Filho (Brazil); Toby Collins (United Kingdom); Siddhant Attavar (India); Artem Boyko; Matouš Šafránek (Czech Republic); Stratos Voudouris (United Kingdom); Lorenss Martinsons (Latvia)	Anita Dalma Páhán (Hungary) Hyunsoo Park (South Korea); Henry Wong Tok Shing (Hong Kong); Olivia Tennisberg (Estonia); Viktoriia Zubkova; Aida Davletova (Kazakhstan); Ikoma Kudo (Japan); Réka Wagener (Germany); Egyházi Hanna (Hungary); Benjamin Móricz (Hungary); Teodor Malchev (Bulgaria); Vita Korošin (Slovenia); Tanupat Trakulthongchai (Thailand); Max Naigeborin (Brazil); Elvira Ageeva; Aleksandra Naydenova (Bulgaria); Katja Andolšek (Slovenia); Aidan Wang (Canada); Nestors Starostins (Latvia); Jan Karpiński (Poland); Nicoleta Dobrică (Romania); Darya Peressypkina (Kazakhstan); Kevin Yan (Canada); Inka Pekkola (Finland); Junhyuk Kwon (South Korea); Rok Tadej Brunšek (Slovenia); Józef Szymański (Poland)
2023	Bansko, Bulgaria	Tam Lok Hang (Hong Kong) Ryusei Omiya (Japan); Wonhyun Soh (South Korea); Vlad-Ștefan Oros (Romania); Daria Kryvosheieva (Ukraine); William Keith Thomson (United Kingdom); Artem Boyko; Kunaal Chandrashekar (Canada); Konstantin Georgiev (Bulgaria); Leonardo Torres (Brazil); Leonardo Paillo (Brazil); Eleonora Stepanova	Elena Păvăloaia (Romania) Panawat Tiacharoen (Thailand); Mihai-Alexandru Bratu (Romania); Viktoriia Zubkova; Jordan Chi (Australia); Samantha Kao (Taiwan); Zhang Yixuan (Hong Kong); He Jianxing (China); Rei Kano (Japan); Wong Tok Shing Henry (Hong Kong); Wojciech Szot (Poland); Daniel Titmas (United Kingdom); Alison Craig-Greene (United Kingdom); Matei Chirila (Romania); Nestors Starostins (Latvia); Sukrith Velmineti (Canada); Teodor Malchev (Bulgaria); Deeraj Pothapragada (United States); Eric Wu (Taiwan); Bartłomiej Rozenberg (Poland); Gyuhwa Lee (South Korea); Faraz Ahmed Siddiqui (India); Benjamin Móricz (Hungary); Rami Hennawi (Bulgaria)	Eleanor Borrel (United Kingdom) Chung Chi-En (Taiwan); Teresa Lage (Brazil); Arul Kolla (United States); Jonasz Kościkiewicz (Poland); Zori Schmidt (United States); Merlin Jonathan Fischer (Germany); Everton Albuquerque De Oliveira (Brazil); Alexander Shlykov; Jiang Yiling (China); Perry Dai (Canada); Benjamin Yang (United States); Luiz Satoshi Yunomae Oikawa (Brazil); Darren Su (United States); Chen Nuo (China); Brest Lenarčič (Slovenia); Mihaela Anghel (Romania); Hiroto Yasui (Japan); Gangrae Kim (South Korea); Li Jiying (China); Wang Po-Hsiang (Taiwan); Valeriia Pischchymukha (Romania); Rando Lukk (Estonia); João Pedro Alves Ferreira (Brazil); Mikhail Iomdin (Israel); Nikolay Georgiev (Bulgaria); Carl Fredrik Constantin Lidberg Dimos (Sweden); Satoshi Tsukada (Japan); Hwang Yen-Hsi (Taiwan); Matěj Čapka (Czech Republic); Manoela Ferraz (Brazil); Bognár András Károly (Hungary)
2024	Brasília, Brazil	Deeraj Pothapragada (United States) Devin Joe (United States); Alison Craig-Greene (United Kingdom); Yipeng Xu (United Kingdom); Tyson Lieu (Australia); Urszula Wąsiewicz (Poland); Ryusei Omiya (Japan); Luiza-Teodora Mihai (Romania); Narongrith Artnarongrith (Thailand); Brest Lenarčič (Slovenia); Leonard Kottisch (Germany); Varin Sikka (United States); Anna Bryłowska (Poland)	Eric Wu (Taiwan) Wong Tok Shing Henry (Hong Kong); Marvin Mao (Canada); Mikhail Iomdin (Germany); Matei Chirilă (Romania); Nadežda Efremova; Matěj Čapka (Czech Republic); Karina-Adriana Stăncescu (Romania); Samantha Kao (Taiwan); Gyuhwa Lee (South Korea); Máté Gergely Virág (Hungary); He Jianxing (China); Jiang Yiling (China); Nia Dimitrova (Bulgaria); Li-Bang Chen (Taiwan); Ekaterina Churkina; Mihaela Anghel (Romania); Animikha Dutta Dhar (India); Keisuke Taeda (Japan); Patricia Király (Slovenia); Gangrae Kim (South Korea); Zhu Yucheng (China); Felipe Moraes Barros (Brazil); Rudolf András Virág (Hungary)	Tanupat Trakulthongchai (Thailand) Satoshi Tsukada (Japan); Denys Tereshchenko (Ukraine); Po-Hsiang Wang (Taiwan); Kantetsu Oh (Japan); Mixail Nikitin; Ji Shu Ching (Hong Kong); Yuji Hokugo (Japan); Richard Dobíšek (Czech Republic); Eleonora Stepanova; Ani Katelieva (Bulgaria); Shrilakshmi Venkatraman (India); Choi John Nathaniel (Hong Kong); Magdalena Vigenina (Bulgaria); Elena Păvăloaia (Romania); Nikolay Georgiev (Bulgaria); Faraz Ahmed Siddiqui (India); Natalia Rewaj (Poland); Rory Ambrosius (Australia); Sirma Karadjova (Bulgaria); Ostap Drushchak (Ukraine); Ivanimira Nedelcheva (Bulgaria); Claire Yen (United Kingdom); Nayoon Goo (South Korea); Miroslav Havel (Czech Republic); Adam Ahlberg (Sweden); Olya Besova (Israel); Ignacy Jackl (Poland)
2025	Taipei, Taiwan	Vanesa Kalinkova (Bulgaria) Aaron Chai (United States); Nikola Nikolov (Bulgaria); Jaehyun Lee (South Korea); Vaageesan Surendran (India); Devin Joe (United States); Ioana-Steliana Barbu (Romania); Urszula Wąsiewicz (Poland); Tom Hammond (United Kingdom); Kyle Zhang (United States); Yipeng Xu (United Kingdom); Max Fisher-Ayres (United Kingdom); Antoni Bryłowski (Poland); Xin Yan Dong (Canada); Ekaterina Churkina	Kalina Ivanova (Bulgaria) Leonard Kottisch (Germany); Kanoa Ziyang Teng (Taiwan); Cheng Dylan Shiying (Singapore); Hiroto Yasui (Japan); Gangrae Kim (South Korea); Hugo Chang (Australia); Yuki Azuma (Japan); Daria Kukshinova; Jason Liu (United States); Narongrith Artnarongrith (Thailand); Claire Yen (United Kingdom); Mixail Nikitin; Yu Matsumoto (Japan); Mikhail Iomdin (Germany); Marvin Maximilian Kessler (Switzerland); Ryota Aizawa (Japan); Ji Shu Ching (Hong Kong); Sirma Karadjova (Bulgaria); Valerie Kopsová (Czech Republic); James Anderson (United Kingdom); Ang-Hsuan Yu (Taiwan)	Mihaela Anghel (Romania) Olga Besova (Israel); Advay Misra (India); Wai Ka Kwan Kevin (United Kingdom); Jigang Jon (South Korea); Martin Bryja (Czech Republic); Leong Seng Yan (Singapore); Patricia Király (Slovenia); Ioana Stănoiu (Romania); Daniel Agi Pigini (Brazil); Yu-Ning Feng (Taiwan); Filip Banek (Poland); Nicla Marabito (United States); Andrei Dragu (Romania); Yiling Jiang (Canada); Po-Yi Chung (Taiwan); Luiza Teodora Mihai (Romania); Joji Mushiaki (Japan); Lin Cheuk Hang (Hong Kong); Sophia Davis Morris (Canada); Elizaveta Dyatlova; Nina Stadermann (United States); Máté Gergely Virág (Hungary); Pavel Vassilev (Bulgaria); Tananon Kinthorn (Thailand); Austin Yang (Taiwan); Rinta Nishino (Japan); Yi-Chiao Liao (Taiwan); Sion Lee (South Korea); Anna Matiášková (Czech Republic); Yin-Shuo Chang (Taiwan); Ivanimira Nedelcheva (Bulgaria); Valeriia Pishchymukha (Romania); Stella Heinzelmann (Germany); Hanna Niesiobędzka (Poland)
2026	Bucharest, Romania	Sridatta Bhamidipati (United Kingdom) Xin Yan Dong (Canada); Yiling Jiang (Canada); Edward Zeng (United States); Sylvia Chen (United States); Yuki Azuma (Japan); Qi Jia (China); Darren Su (United States); Kenji Lee (Japan); Ariel Joshua Lau (Singapore); Zi Kun Chen (Canada); Hiroto Yasui (Japan); Mikhail Iomdin (Germany); Shrilakshmi Venkatraman (India)	Kanoa Ziyang Teng (Taiwan) Adavya Goyal (United Kingdom); Sophie Zhang (Australia); Felipe Moraes Barros (Brazil); Antoni Bryłowski (Poland); Alexandru-Ioan Pârv (Romania); Luiza-Teodora Mihai (Romania); Perry Dai (Canada); Zicheng Dai (Japan); Yiming Qiao (Germany); Elena Păvăloaia (Romania); Theo Lomone (Hong Kong); Aleksander Żuk (Poland); James Anderson (United Kingdom); Zhou Haoxuan (China); Vivian Zhang (Australia); Victoria Chen (United Kingdom); Ana-Teodora Grigorie (Romania); Daniel Richardson (United Kingdom); Radu-Gheorghe Tănăsescu (Romania); Sion Lee (South Korea); Zachary Zi-En Wang (Australia); Elisaveta Khoretonenko; Martin Bryja (Czech Republic); Fu Boran (China); Ji Shu Ching (Hong Kong); Olga Besova (Israel); Zhou Yukai (China); Bo-Ting Wu (Taiwan); Mihaela Anghel (Romania)	Leung Yui Ki (Hong Kong) Radoslav Stefanov (Bulgaria); Shyngys Karassayev (Kazakhstan); Levi O. Matias (Brazil); Cheng Dylan Shiying (Singapore); Elizaveta Dyatlova; Stella Heinzelmann (Germany); Jason Liu (United States); Chihiro Higo (Japan); Vladyslav Khalin (Ukraine); Miia Saar (Estonia); Sirui “Kris” Sheng (United States); Yeojun Park (South Korea); Semyon Kuritsyn; Dominica Sagirova; Kirill Korostelev (Republic of Ireland); Gergely Péter Sánta (Hungary); Mihail Boshov (Bulgaria); Siyana Pavlova (Bulgaria); Shao-Yang Hsu (Taiwan); Aarav Anil Rao (India); Yu-An Chang (Taiwan); Rehan Babu (United States); Amber Li (Australia); Anna Matiášková (Czech Republic); Nishanth Shankar Lakshmanan (India); Petar Velev (Bulgaria); Hao Xinyi (China); Sofiia Slyvchenko (Germany); Advay Misra (India); József Áron Pázmándi (Hungary); Misaki Ninomiya (Japan); Valerie Kopsová (Czech Republic); Kalina Ivanova (Bulgaria); Martin Zhang (Sweden); Ang-Hsuan Yu (Taiwan); Andrei Dragu (Romania); Georgi Iliev (Bulgaria); Yoona Kim (South Korea); Gavriel Harvey (Switzerland)

== Team medals ==
Nbr	Year	Location	Team Gold	Team Silver	Team Bronze	Winning team in individual competition
1	2003	Borovets, Bulgaria	Netherlands	Russia-StPetersburg	Russia-Moscow	Netherlands
2	2004	Moscow, Russia	Russia-StPetersburg	Latvia	Bulgaria-1	Bulgaria-1
3	2005	Leiden, The Netherlands	Netherlands	Russia-Moscow	Russia-StPetersburg	Bulgaria-1
4	2006	Tartu, Estonia	Bulgaria-2	Netherlands	Poland-1	Bulgaria-1
5	2007	Saint Petersburg, Russia	USA-2 (United States); Moscow (Russia)	Bulgaria-1; Bulgaria-2	None awarded	Estonia
6	2008	Sunny Beach, Bulgaria	USA-2 (United States); Bulgaria-East	Netherlands; USA-1 (United States)	None awarded	USA (United States)
7	2009	Wrocław, Poland	USA-Red (United States)	Korea-1 (South Korea)	Russia-Moscow	Russia-Moscow
8	2010	Stockholm, Sweden	Latvia	Russia-Moscow	Poland-2	USA-Blue (United States)
9	2011	Pittsburgh, USA	USA-Red (United States)	Russia-StPetersburg	Russia-Moscow	USA-Red (United States)
10	2012	Ljubljana, Slovenia	USA-Blue (United States)	Netherlands	Poland-2	Russia-StPetersburg
11	2013	Manchester, UK	USA-Red (United States)	Russia-StPetersburg	Bulgaria-1; Romania	USA-Red (United States)
12	2014	Beijing, China	USA-Red (United States)	Russia-StPetersburg	Russia-Moscow	USA-Red (United States)
13	2015	Blagoevgrad, Bulgaria	UK-West (United Kingdom)	USA-Red (United States)	Poland-White; Netherlands	USA-Red (United States)
14	2016	Mysore, India	Sweden	Australia-1	UK (United Kingdom)	USA-Red (United States)
15	2017	Dublin, Ireland	Taiwan-TaiTWO	Poland-Ą	Slovenia	UK-K (United Kingdom)
16	2018	Prague, Czech Republic	USA-Blue (United States)	USA-Red (United States); Bulgaria 1	Brazil Pões; UK-U (United Kingdom); Czech Republic Tým křivopřísežníků	USA-Blue (United States)
17	2019	Yongin, South Korea	Slovenia	China KUN; Russia Strelka	Poland Bóbr; Russia Belka; Malaysia A	USA Red (United States)
18	2021	Ventspils, Latvia	Ukraine і	USA Red (United States)	India Saffron; Canada Moose	Hong Kong EAT
19	2022	Castletown, Isle of Man	Korea Mal (South Korea)	Taiwan Blue Magpie; Japan Samurai	Japan Ninja; USA Red (United States); UK K (United Kingdom)	USA Red (United States)
20	2023	Bansko, Bulgaria	United Kingdom	USA Red (United States); Canada Anglophone	Finland; Hungary Uborka; Poland Ę	Not awarded
21	2024	Brasília, Brazil	Czech Republic	Poland Świerszcze	Taiwan Black Bear; Japan Samurai; Slovenia	United Kingdom
22	2025	Taipei, Taiwan	Taiwan Blue Magpie	Taiwan Black Bear; UK Foot-Strut (United Kingdom)	Brazil Fêsãw; Thailand	United Kingdom
23	2026	Bucharest, Romania	Germany Umlaut	HKLO (Hong Kong); Philippines Hinirang	Taiwan Black Bear; Czech Republic Bylo nás pět China KUN	Canada Anglophone

== All-time medal table ==
The list is accurate up to 2026. The rank is sorted by gold, then silver, then bronze, then number of honorary mentions. Rows in red denote currently defunct teams.

Rank	Country	Appearances	Gold	Silver	Bronze	Total	Honorable mentions	Team Contest Awards	Average Score Awards	Best Solutions	Final year
1	United States of America	19 (2007)	30	40	33	103	26	8 Gold; 5 Silver; 1 Bronze; 3 HM	9 Gold; 1 Silver; 4 Bronze	22	
2	Bulgaria	23 (2003)	24	28	49	101	27	2 Gold; 3 Silver; 2 Bronze; 5 HM	3 Gold; 6 Silver	15	
3	United Kingdom	17 (2009)	21	20	17	58	22	2 Gold; 1 Silver; 3 Bronze; 2 HM	1 Gold; 1 Bronze	6	
4	Russia ^{1}	18 (2021)	17	31	40	88	21	2 Gold; 7 Silver; 6 Bronze; 2 HM	2 Gold; 8 Silver; 6 Bronze	27	
5	Poland	22 (2004)	14	29	25	68	45	2 Silver; 6 Bronze; 3 HM	3 Bronze	14	
6	Japan	14 (2012)	10	10	16	36	20	1 Silver; 2 Bronze; 2 HM	1 Bronze	5	
7	Romania	15 (2005)	7	16	18	41	11	2 HM	1 Silver	4	
8	India	17 (2009)	6	9	22	37	19	1 Bronze; 1 HM	1 Bronze	9	
9	Canada Anglophone ^{2}	9 (2017)	6	6	8	20	6	1 Silver; 1 Bronze; 2 HM	1 Gold; 1 Bronze	3	
10	South Korea	18 (2008)	5	8	23	36	30	1 Gold; 1 Silver; 3 HM	0	7	
11	Brazil	13 (2011)	3	7	11	21	18	2 Bronze; 1 HM	0	3	
12	Ukraine	12 (2014)	3	5	10	18	14	1 Gold; 2 HM	0	4	
13	Netherlands	23 (2003)	3	3	4	10	20	2 Gold; 3 Silver; 1 Bronze	1 Gold	4	
14	Taiwan	13 (2013)	2	18	18	38	20	2 Gold; 2 Silver; 2 Bronze; 2 HM	0	5	
15	China	12 (2012)	2	16	16	34	25	1 Silver; 1 Bronze; 4 HM	1 Bronze	6	
16	Czech Republic	16 (2003)	2	11	11	24	14	1 Gold; 2 Bronze; 2 HM	0	6	
17	Hong Kong, China	7 (2019)	2	9	6	17	6	1 Silver; 3 HM	1 Gold	6	
18	Australia	17 (2009)	2	7	7	16	11	1 Silver	0	4	
19	Germany	12 (2008)	2	6	7	15	17	1 Gold; 2 HM	0	2	
20	Estonia	23 (2003)	1	7	19	27	19	0	1 Gold; 1 Bronze	8	
21	Latvia	23 (2003)	1	5	12	18	14	1 Gold; 1 Silver	0	5	
22	Slovenia	18 (2008)	1	5	11	17	14	1 Gold; 2 Bronze; 1 HM	0	7	
23	Singapore	10 (2010)	1	5	6	12	12	1 HM	0	0	
24	Thailand	5 (2022)	1	2	3	6	4	1 Bronze; 2 HM	0	2	
25	Canada ^{2}	6 (2011)	1	1	4	6	9	0	1 Silver	2	2016
26	Hungary	14 (2012)	0	5	14	19	15	1 Bronze	0	2	
27	Sweden	19 (2007)	0	2	11	13	11	1 Gold; 1 HM	0	2	
28	Malaysia	7 (2018)	0	2	1	3	4	1 Bronze; 1 HM	0	0	
29	Israel	5 (2012)	0	1	3	4	0	0	0	0	
30	Switzerland	5 (2022)	0	1	1	2	5	0	0	0	
31	Kazakhstan	11 (2015)	0	0	6	6	10	0	0	0	
32	Ireland	17 (2009)	0	0	4	4	10	1 HM	0	0	
33	Finland	10 (2005)	0	0	1	1	5	1 Bronze; 1 HM	0	0	
34	Serbia	7 (2004)	0	0	1	1	4	0	0	1	2013
35	Turkey	8 (2013)	0	0	1	1	0	0	0	0	
36	Macau	2 (2025)	0	0	0	0	2	0	0	0	
37	Spain	6 (2007)	0	0	0	0	1	1 HM	0	0	
38	Austria	1 (2026)	0	0	0	0	1	0	0	0	
39	Iran	3 (2024)	0	0	0	0	1	0	0	0	
40	Malta	3 (2024)	0	0	0	0	1	0	0	0	
41	Moldova	4 (2022)	0	0	0	0	1	0	0	1	
42	Nepal	5 (2019)	0	0	0	0	1	0	0	0	
43	Norway	2 (2010)	0	0	0	0	1	0	0	0	2021
44	Philippines	4 (2023)	0	0	0	0	0	1 Silver	0	0	
45	Azerbaijan	2 (2021)	0	0	0	0	0	0	0	0	2022
46	Bangladesh	3 (2019)	0	0	0	0	0	0	0	0	2019
47	Canada Francophone ^{2}	9 (2017)	0	0	0	0	0	0	0	0	
48	Colombia	6 (2019)	0	0	0	0	0	0	0	1	
49	Denmark	2 (2018)	0	0	0	0	0	0	0	0	2019
50	France	2 (2015)	0	0	0	0	0	0	0	0	2021
51	Greece	4 (2012)	0	0	0	0	0	0	0	0	
52	Isle of Man	12 (2013)	0	0	0	0	0	0	0	0	
53	Lithuania	1 (2006)	0	0	0	0	0	0	0	0	2006
54	Pakistan	2 (2014)	0	0	0	0	0	0	0	0	2016
55	Sri Lanka	1 (2016)	0	0	0	0	0	0	0	0	2016
56	United Arab Emirates	3 (2011)	0	0	0	0	0	0	0	0	
57	Uzbekistan	1 (2019)	0	0	0	0	0	0	0	0	2019
58	Vietnam	3 (2011)	0	0	0	0	0	0	0	0	2025

1. ^{b} Since 2022, Russia has been competing under the banner of Independent.
2. ^{a} Starting from 2017, Canada has been split into two teams, namely Canada Anglophone (qualifying via NACLO) and Canada Francophone (via the Olympiade linguistique canadienne francophone)

== Media coverage ==
- Newspaper article in The Age: "It may be semantics, but linguistics can be a team event". July 27, 2012.

== See also ==
- International Science Olympiad
- North American Computational Linguistics Open competition
- United Kingdom Linguistics Olympiad
- Panini Linguistics Olympiad
- Bulgarian National Olympiad in Linguistics
- Australian Computational and Linguistics Olympiad
- Asia Pacific Linguistics Olympiad
