= Bulgarian National Olympiad in Linguistics =

The Bulgarian National Olympiad in Linguistics (Bulgarian: Олимпиада по математическа лингвистика) is an olympiad for school students in Bulgaria, composed of three rounds: municipal, regional and national. The olympiad's present format has been used every year since 2003.

== Tasks ==
The tasks used for the linguistics olympiad are generally stand-alone, i.e. for their solution, the contestant does not need to be familiar with the language on which the problem is set. Naturally, a basic knowledge in linguistics, mathematics and general knowledge is recommended.

== Format ==
The olympiad takes place in three rounds: municipal, regional and national. The common link between them is that each round includes an individual solution to three tasks in 4 hours. There are two age groups: 5th-7th and 8th-12th grade, as the national round is only for the older group.

=== Municipal round ===
The municipal round of the olympiad takes place in schools and the marking is done by the local organisers. Although the National Commission released an example theme for the municipal round, this is not obligatory. Anyone who wants to can participate in the first round but only students who have received more than 75 points qualify for the next round.

=== Regional round ===
The second round of the olympiad takes place in the regional cities at the same time, usually on a Saturday or Sunday at the end of March or the beginning of April. The participants' papers are sent to the National Commission for marking. Only students who have received more than 75 points can participate in the next round of the olympiad.

=== National round ===
The third round takes place in a different linguistics centre each year and takes place in last two days of the last week of April or the first week in May. In addition to the individual competition, the national round also includes a team competition, which normally involved up to 3 or 4 students per team. The marking of the scripts happens on-site and the results are announced at the official ceremony, at which awards and certificates are handed out. The top scorers proceed to a follow-up competition, to be selected for the national team of Bulgaria in the International Linguistics Olympiad.

== See also ==
- International Linguistics Olympiad
- United Kingdom Linguistics Olympiad
- North American Computational Linguistics Open competition
- Linguistics
