= Text, Speech and Dialogue =

Annual conference involving topics such as natural speech processing

- Abbreviation: TSD
- Discipline: Natural language processing, computational linguistics

Publication details
- Publisher: Springer
- History: 1998–present
- Frequency: annual
- Website: www.tsdconference.org

Text, Speech and Dialogue (TSD) is an annual conference involving topics on natural language processing and computational linguistics. The meeting is held every September, organized alternatively by academics from Brno and Plzeň, Czech Republic.

The first Text, Speech and Dialogue conference took place in Brno in 1998.

== Overview ==
TSD series evolved as a prime forum for interaction between researchers in both spoken and written language processing from all over the world. Proceedings of TSD form a book published by Springer-Verlag in their Lecture Notes in Artificial Intelligence (LNAI) series. TSD proceedings are regularly indexed by Thomson Reuters Conference Proceedings Citation Index. Moreover, LNAI series are listed in all major citation databases such as DBLP, SCOPUS, EI, INSPEC or COMPENDEX.

The conference is organized by the Faculty of Informatics, Masaryk University, Brno, and the Faculty of Applied Sciences, University of West Bohemia, Plzeň. The conference is supported by the International Speech Communication Association.

== Conference topics ==
Conference topics were:

- Corpora and language resources (monolingual, multilingual, text and spoken corpora, large web corpora, disambiguation, specialized lexicons, dictionaries)
- Speech recognition (multilingual, continuous, emotional speech, handicapped speaker, out-of-vocabulary words, alternative way of feature extraction, new models for acoustic and language modelling)
- Tagging, classification and parsing of text and speech (morphological and syntactic analysis, synthesis and disambiguation, multilingual processing, sentiment analysis, credibility analysis, automatic text labeling, summarization, authorship attribution)
- Speech and spoken language generation (multilingual, high fidelity speech synthesis, computer singing)
- Semantic processing of text and speech (information extraction, information retrieval, data mining, semantic web, knowledge representation, inference, ontologies, sense disambiguation, plagiarism detection)
- Integrating applications of text and speech processing (natural language understanding, question-answering strategies, assistive technologies)
- Machine translation (statistical, rule-based, example-based, hybrid, text and speech translation)
- Automatic dialogue systems (self-learning, multilingual, question-answering systems, dialogue strategies, prosody in dialogues)
- Multimodal Techniques and Modelling (video processing, facial animation, visual speech synthesis, user modeling, emotions and personality modeling)

== Past keynote speakers ==
Year	Keynote speakers
2002	James Pustejovsky, Misha Pavel, Yorick Wilks, Ronald Allan Cole
2004	Kenneth Church, Patrick Hanks, James Pustejovsky, Jan Odijk
2006	Eduard Hovy, Louise Guthrie, James Pustejovsky, Eva Hudlická
2007	Frederick Jelinek, Eva Hajičová, David Nahamoo, Heinrich Niemann, Renato De Mori
2008	Jerry Hobbs, Elizabeth Shriberg, Graeme Hirst
2009	Tilman Becker, Louise Guthrie, Hynek Heřmanský, Frederick Jelinek, Elmar Nöth, Roberto Pieraccini
2010	John Carroll, Christiane Fellbaum, Miroslav Novak, Frederick Jelinek
2011	Hynek Heřmanský, Adam Sporka, Siegfried Kunzmann
2012	Ruslan Mitkov, Walter Daelemans, Adam Kilgarriff
2013	Hynek Hermansky, Ralf Steinberger, Ron Cole, Viktor Zakharov
2014	Ralph Grishman, Bernardo Magnini, Salim Roukos
2015	Hermann Ney, Dan Roth, Björn W. Schuller, Peter D. Turney, Alexander Waibel
2016	Hinrich Schütze, Ido Dagan
2017	Eva Hajičová, Tomáš Mikolov, Michael Picheny, Rico Sennrich, Lucia Specia
2018	Kenneth W. Church, Piek Vossen, Isabel Trancoso

== See also ==
- The list of computer science conferences contains other academic conferences.
