= Australian Computational and Linguistics Olympiad =

The Australian Computational and Linguistics Olympiad (OzCLO) is a linguistics and computational linguistics competition for high school students in Australia, and has been held annually since 2008. The competition aims to introduce students in Years 9–12 to language puzzles so they can develop problem-solving strategies and learn about the structures and diversity of the world's languages. The competition has grown each year, and now involves around 1500 students participating from schools around the country.

== Aims ==
The OzCLO competition aims to help high school students learn about the systematic nature of language through puzzles based on various types of language data, while illustrating the richness that can be found in the world's languages. The competition also aims to help students develop their logic and reasoning skills by developing their own strategies, in small groups, for solving language puzzles. More broadly, OzCLO also aims to develop greater awareness of linguistics and computational linguistics among high school students, and encourage interest in these areas, potentially increasing university enrolments in these disciplines.

== History ==
The first Australian Computational and Linguistics Olympiad was held in 2008. It was organised by linguists Dominique Estival, Jane Simpson, Rachel Nordlinger and Jean Mulder, and was supported by the Human Communication Science Network (HCSNet), the Australasian Language Technology Association (ALTA), the Australian Linguistic Society (ALS), and the Commonwealth Scientific and Industrial Research Organisation (CSIRO). The first competition involved 119 students from 22 schools in Victoria and New South Wales, and was hosted by the University of Melbourne and the University of Sydney. The 2009 competition was additionally held in South Australia, Queensland, Australian Capital Territory and Western Australia, and OzCLO has been held in the Northern Territory since 2013. Around 1500 students from around 90 schools now participate.

== Format ==
The OzCLO competition is held in two rounds, and is designed for high school students in Years 9–12. The First Round is a regional competition, usually held in February or March each year. In this round, students from different schools in Australian states and territories work in teams of up to four and attempt to solve a set of language analysis problems over two hours. Competitions have been held at local host universities, but since 2012 web-based participation has also been available. The top three teams from each regional competition are then invited to participate in the National Round, and the winning team from the National Round then has the opportunity to attend the International Linguistics Olympiad representing Australia.

== Attendance at the International Linguistics Olympiad ==
Australia has had a representative team at each International Linguistics Olympiad (IOL) since 2009. From 2010 onwards, they have received an achievement (honourable mention/medal) in every olympiad. Their successes are detailed in the table below.

Year	Achievement	Name
2010	Honourable mention	Michelle Jayasuriya
2011	Silver	Paul Lau
2012	Honourable mention	Kai-Xing Goh
2013	Bronze	Martyna Judd
2014	Bronze	James Matthew Abel
2014	Honourable mention	Anthony Bruce Ma
2014	Honourable mention	Vikram Sondergaard
2015	Bronze	Anthony Bruce Ma
2015	Honourable mention	James Matthew Abel
2016	Gold	Max Zhang
2016	Silver	Henry Wu
2016	Honourable mention	Tom Ryan
2018	Bronze	James Phillips
2018	Honourable mention	Jisu Choi
2018	Honourable mention	Jenny Wang
2021	Bronze	Noah Gorrell
2022	Honourable mention	Eunsu Choi
2023	Honourable mention	Zian Shang
2023	Silver	Jordan Chi
2024	Bronze	Rory Ambrosius
2024	Gold	Tyson Lieu
2025	Honourable mention	Nicholas Wang
2025	Silver	Hugo Chang

== See also ==
- International Linguistics Olympiad
- United Kingdom Linguistics Olympiad
- North American Computational Linguistics Open competition
