= Natural Language Processing (journal) =

- Discipline: Natural language processing, computational linguistics
- Language: English
- Edited by: Ruslan Mitkov

Publication details
- Former name: Natural Language Engineering
- History: 1995–present
- Publisher: Cambridge University Press
- Frequency: Bimonthly
- Open access: Yes
- License: Creative Commons license
- Impact factor: 2.3 (2023)

Standard abbreviations
- ISO 4: Nat. Lang. Proc.

Indexing
- ISSN: 1351-3249 (print); 1469-8110 (web)
- LCCN: 96658608
- OCLC no.: 813494929

Links
- Journal homepage; Online access; Online archive

Natural Language Processing is a bimonthly peer-reviewed academic journal published by Cambridge University Press which covers research and software in natural language processing. It was established in 1995 as Natural Language Engineering, obtaining its current title in 2024. Other than original publications on theoretical and applied aspects of computational linguistics, the journal also contains Industry Watch and Emerging Trends columns tracking developments in the field. The editor-in-chief is Ruslan Mitkov (Lancaster University). From 2024 the journal is published completely open access. According to the Journal Citation Reports, the journal has a 2023 impact factor of 2.3.
