= Milo Mazurkiewicz =

Polish linguist (1995–2019)

- Born: 28 January 1995; Złotów, Poland
- Died: 6 May 2019 (aged 24); Warsaw, Poland
- Cause of death: Suicide by drowning
- Known for: Queer activism

Milo Andrea Mazurkiewicz (28 January 1995 – 6 May 2019) was a Polish queer activist, linguist, and information systems technician. They used the Polish neutral pronoun ono and accepted the use of feminine pronouns. (Note: For consistency, Mazurkiewicz is referred to with the English singular gender neutral pronouns they/them throughout this article)

== Early life and education ==
Mazurkiewicz was born in Złotów. There was a mix-up due to Mazurkiewicz's mother sharing a first and last name with another woman who had given birth, which led to a different infant being brought to their parents before the mistake was noticed. Their parents split when they were four years old, and they were raised by their mother. Mazurkiewicz showed prowess for linguistics in early childhood, and their first documented attempts at creating artificial languages date back to 2001.

In the school year 2013/2014, as a student from the 1st High School in Złotów, Mazurkiewicz won the final of the 12th Olympiad in Mathematical Linguistics (scoring 115 out of 120 possible points, the next competitor had 30 points less) and won the 1st place individually during the 12th International Linguistics Olympiad in Beijing (competing with 152 competitors from 28 countries). The jury awarded 41 individual medals (7 gold, 13 silver and 21 bronze) and 9 prizes for the best solved tasks. Milo scored 84 points (the next competitors on the podium, from the US and Canada, scored 81 and 73 points respectively) and the prize for the best solved problem.

After graduating from high school with a matura diploma, Milo studied computer science at the Poznań University of Technology. They received a scholarship from the Minister of National Education, graduating in 2017 with a degree in computer science. They were known for their humorous invention of the mathematical constant "ęć", where π + ęć = 5 ($\pi$ is pronounced as [pi] in Polish, and when combined with "ęć" creates "pięć" ([pjɛɲt͡ɕ]), the Polish word for five).

== Activism ==
Mazurkiewicz spoke out about the prolonged and invasive process to transition in Poland, saying in a public speech "why should anyone tell me what to look like? Who can I feel and who not? I feel as if my genitals belong to the state!".

== Personal life ==
On 18 Apr 2018 Milo published a Twitter thread describing their relationship with gender:

I have a story to tell you.

For the most of my life, I didn't really *get* how it is to be transgender.

The “standard” “cis” ways of visualizing it didn't speak to me, as I didn't find myself particularly connected to masculinity or find issue with having to live not as a man.

Assuming that what I felt is what most people feel, I grew convinced that, while some people might experience a profound connection to their birth gender, or to some other gender, the norm is not to have any at all.

I grew skeptical of notions of “cisgender” and “transgender”.

If you asked me a few years ago, I might have called myself “agender”. But then I might have called most of society “agender” at that time.

It didn't occur to me that it might be just me being the exception and not the rule.

And then, years later, I started poking around and for the first time in my life found something that really resonated with me. I started reading trans people describing their experiences and it was like finding a missing piece.

No, the society is cis, it's just me that's not.

If you don't feel like “woman” or “man”, whichever you were given, fully describes you, and if you feel like your biology is the only connection you have to your gender, your name, your pronouns...

You might want to poke around. You might end up a happier person.

Mazurkiewicz came out to their father as non-binary in 2018 and was met with acceptance; however, their mother was reluctant to acknowledge their gender.

On 24 April, Milo officially changed the data on their ID card at the Registry Office. Reportedly, they had an Andrea Bocelli record on them in case the clerk doubted that there is such a masculine name; the Polish equivalent of the name Andrea is Andrzej, the name Milo was registered under as a baby, while Andrea is a name more commonly associated with femininity in Polish due to the suffix -a. They also resigned from the part of the surname that is inflected, i.e. from Dubieński, and were left with "Mazurkiewicz". In May, Mazurkiewicz moved to Poznań, renting an apartment for a lease until August.

Mazurkiewicz presented as gender-nonconforming, and thus had struggled to obtain a diagnosis of gender dysphoria, as reportedly their doctors requested them to "dress female".

== Death ==
On 6 May 2019, Mazurkiewicz was supposed to have an appointment with a psychologist in Warsaw; it was never confirmed if they appeared.

Information about their death appeared on 17 May on the Facebook page of the Stonewall Group, which reported that the activist died on 6 May after they jumped from the Łazienkowski bridge in Warsaw. Their death has been attributed to the high rates of transphobia in Poland.

A widely publicized post Milo wrote for their Facebook account on 2 May illustrated their state of mind during their final days:

I'm fed up. I'm fed up with being treated like a piece of shit. I'm fed up with people (psychologists, doctors, therapists) telling me I can't be who I am because I don't look like that. Treating me as if it was all in my head and telling me I need papers proving it. Caring more about how I dress than how I feel. Telling me that it's good that my chosen name is neutral-sounding, that it's good my body is not extremely feminine, that it's good I haven't come out at work (yet). Telling me that maybe I should stop being (trying to be) myself and wait until other doctors and therapists decide I can. I'm fed up of all of that. Sometimes it makes me fight even more. Sometimes it makes me want to end it all and stop my life right here. Sometimes it just makes me want to cry. I wish I could see any hope on the horizon. I wish I could hear another answer than “some day, eventually, it's gonna be better”. I wish I could feel alive today, at this moment.

Their last post, saying "I'm sorry", has a timestamp of 6 May, 14:51 GMT+1. A friend reported Mazurkiewicz missing to Poznań police on 8 May.

Mazurkiewicz's body was found in the Vistula on 15 May, roughly nine days after they were last seen. Mazurkiewicz's identity was confirmed six weeks later through DNA testing. They were cremated and buried in their hometown of Złotów.

== Legacy ==
On 24 May 2019, a group of queer activists tried to hang a rainbow flag on the Łazienkowski bridge in commemoration of Mazurkiewicz. A group of passers-by accosted the mourners and tried to tear down the flag. The flag was finally unfurled only when policemen had arrived to protect the demonstrators.

A fund for transgender women and transfeminine individuals in Poland has been set up in Mazurkiewicz's name, citing her profound dissatisfaction with the current state of Polish transgender healthcare and legal status, specifically the complete lack of National Health Fund coverage for any gender-affirming procedures.

Since the 21st edition of the Olympiad in Mathematical Linguistics, the Milo Mazurkiewicz Prize is awarded at the final for the best solution to one of the tasks.
