= Dragomir R. Radev =

American computer scientist (1968–2023)

Dragomir R. Radev (August 7, 1968 – March 29, 2023) was an American computer scientist who was a professor at Yale University, working on natural language processing and information retrieval. He also served as a University of Michigan computer science professor and Columbia University computer science adjunct professor, as well as a Member of the Advisory Board of Lawyaw.

Radev worked in the fields of open domain question answering, multi-document summarization, large language models and the application of NLP in Bioinformatics, Social Network Analysis and Political Science.

Radev received his PhD in computer science from Columbia University in 1999. He had served on the executive committee of the Association for Computational Linguistics, and as survey editor and associate editor of the Journal of Artificial Intelligence Research.

Radev died on March 29, 2023, at the age of 54.

== IOL ==
Radev served as the coach and led the US national team in the International Linguistics Olympiad (IOL) to several gold medals .

== Awards ==
As NACLO founder, Radev shared the Linguistic Society of America 2011 Linguistics, Language and the Public Award. He was the co-winner of the Gosnell Prize (2006).

In 2015, he was named an ACM Fellow "for contributions to natural language processing and computational linguistics." He was elected a Fellow of the Association for the Advancement of Artificial Intelligence in 2020.

In 2022, Dragomir Radev received the 2022 ACL Distinguished Service Award.

== Books ==
- Natural Language Interfaces to Databases (2023)

- Puzzles in Logic, Languages and Computation (2013)
- Mihalcea and Radev (2011) Graph-based methods for NLP and IR

== Selected Papers ==
- SIGIR 1995 Generating summaries of multiple news articles
- ANLP 1997 Building a generation knowledge source using internet-accessible newswire
- Computational Linguistics 1998 Generating natural language summaries from multiple on-line sources
- ACL 1998 Learning correlations between linguistic indicators and semantic constraints: Reuse of context dependent descriptions of entities
- ANLP 2000 Ranking suspected answers to natural language questions using predictive annotation
- CIKM 2001 Mining the web for answers to natural language questions
- AAAI 2002 Towards CST-enhanced summarization
- ACL 2003 Evaluation challenges in large-scale multi-document summarization: the Mead project
- Information Processing and Management 2004 Centroid-based summarization of multiple documents
- Journal of Artificial Intelligence Research 2004 LexRank: Graph-based lexical centrality as salience in text summarization
- Journal of the American Association of Information Science and Technology 2005 Probabilistic question answering on the web
- Communications of the ACM 2005 NewsInEssence: summarizing online news topics
- EMNLP 2007 Semi-supervised classification for extracting protein interaction sentences using dependency parsing
- Bioinformatics 2008 Identifying gene-disease associations using centrality on a literature mined gene-interaction network
- IEEE Intelligent Systems 2008 natural language processing and the web
- NAACL 2009 Generating surveys of scientific paradigms
- Nucleic Acids Research 2009 Michigan molecular interactions r2: from interacting proteins to pathways
- Journal of the American Association of Information Science and Technology 2009 Visual overviews for discovering key papers and influences across research fronts
- KDD 2010 Divrank: the interplay of prestige and diversity in information networks
- American Journal of Political Science 2010 How to Analyze Political Attention with Minimal Assumptions and Costs
- Arxiv 2011 The effect of linguistic constraints on the large scale organization of language
- Journal of Biomedical Semantics 2011 Mining of vaccine-associated ifn-gamma gene interaction networks using the vaccine ontology
- CoNLL 2017 Graph-based Neural Multi-Document Summarization
- EMNLP 2018 Spider: A Large-Scale Human-Labeled Dataset for Complex and Cross-Domain Semantic Parsing and Text-to-SQL Task
- TACL 2021 Summeval: Re-evaluating summarization evaluation
- ACL 2019 Multi-News: a Large-Scale Multi-Document Summarization Dataset and Abstractive Hierarchical Model
- NAACL 2021 QMSum: A New Benchmark for Query-based Multi-domain Meeting Summarization
- NAACL 2021 Dart: Open-domain structured data record to text generation
- EMNLP 2024 FOLIO: Natural Language Reasoning with First-Order Logic
