= Lori Levin =

American computer scientist

- Born: Lorraine Susan Levin
- Education: University of Pennsylvania (BA); Massachusetts Institute of Technology (PhD)
- Scientific career
- Fields: Computer science; Computational linguistics
- Workplaces: University of Pittsburgh; Carnegie Mellon University

Lorraine Susan (Lori) Levin is an American computer scientist and computational linguist specializing in natural language processing, particularly involving syntax, morphosyntax, and languages with small corpora. She is a research professor in the Language Technologies Institute of the Carnegie Mellon University School of Computer Science, and one of the founders of the North American Computational Linguistics Open Competition.

== Education and career ==
Levin has a 1979 bachelor's degree in linguistics (summa cum laude) from the University of Pennsylvania, and a 1986 Ph.D. in linguistics from the Massachusetts Institute of Technology. Her dissertation, Operations on Lexical Forms: Unaccusative Rules in Germanic Languages, was jointly supervised by Joan Bresnan and Kenneth L. Hale.

She worked as an assistant professor of linguistics at the University of Pittsburgh from 1983 until 1988, when she joined the Carnegie Mellon University Language Technologies Institute.

== Recognition ==
Levin was named as a Fellow of the Association for Computational Linguistics in 2025, "for pioneering work on the use of phonetics, syntax, lexical semantics and dialogue modeling in machine translation and in the transfer of NLP technologies to low resource languages, as well as an enduring contribution to the North American Computational Linguistics Olympiad". Levin was awarded the Antonio Zampolli prize of the ELRA Language Resources Association at the LREC 2026 conference.
