= United Kingdom Linguistics Olympiad =

Linguistics competition in the United Kingdom

- Genre: Linguistics Olympiad
- Frequency: Annual
- Venue: Nationwide
- Country: United Kingdom
- Inaugurated: 2010
- Participants: c. 5000
- Patron: Christine Ohuruogu
- Website: www.uklo.org

The United Kingdom Linguistics Olympiad (UKLO) is a linguistics competition for primary and secondary school students in the United Kingdom. The competition is divided into four levels: Breakthrough, Foundation, Intermediate and Advanced, collectively known as 'Round 1', with the top-scoring 5% of entrants at Advanced level (formerly the top 16 entrants) eligible for a follow-on round, called 'Round 2' and selection for participation in the International Linguistics Olympiad, one of the international science olympiads. In 2009, teams from two schools competed in a pilot competition, with the winners taking part in the international contest as guests of the All-Ireland Linguistics Olympiad. In 2010, an independent olympiad was created and has taken place every year since.

== History ==
Problem-solving competitions in linguistics for secondary school students have been taking place around the world since the 1960s. In Russia, the Moscow and St Petersburg Linguistic Olympiads are credited with inspiring hundreds of young talented scholars to choose linguistics as an academic major and profession. Currently there are national contests within Europe, North and South America, Africa, Asia and Australia. There is also an International Linguistics Olympiad in which students from many countries compete, which began in 2003, and was first hosted by Bulgaria.

In 2009, two UK schools, the Manchester Grammar School and Downlands Community School, took part as guests in the Irish competition, and the winning team represented the UK at the International Olympiad. This triggered the foundation of a permanent committee for the UK Linguistics Olympiad, and the creation of a consortium of olympiads held in English-speaking countries, ELCLO, as a means for pooling resources with NACLO, AILO and OzCLO, the American, Irish and Australian Linguistics Olympiads respectively. The UKLO committee is chaired by Dick Hudson, with Neil Sheldon serving as vice-chair.

In 2010, 560 students from 28 schools entered, 223 at Foundation, and 337 at Advanced level. In 2011, 1165 entries were received from 49 schools, 349 at Foundation, and 816 at Advanced level. 2012 saw the introduction of the Intermediate level, with 1912 entries from 300 schools, 432 at Foundation, 498 at Intermediate and 982 at Advanced level. 2013 saw total entries number 2878, with 1069 at Foundation, 643 at Intermediate and 1166 at Advanced level. In 2015, a new, lowest entry level was introduced, called Breakthrough, with 96 entrants. By 2018, the numbers had increased to 220 in Breakthrough, 1042 at Foundation, 970 at Intermediate and 1650 at Advanced.

The Olympiad has sponsorship and support from various organisations including the British Academy, The Linguistics Association of Great Britain, The British Association for Applied Linguistics, The Philological Society, Routes into Languages, The School of English Literature, Language and Linguistics, University of Sheffield and The School of Philosophy, Psychology & Language Sciences, University of Edinburgh.

The Olympiad has received coverage in the first and second issues of Babel magazine, as well as in the Francophonie journal and Attain magazine. Olympic athlete Christine Ohuruogu MBE is the patron of UKLO, having completed a Linguistics degree at University College London.

The UK has sent a delegation to the International Linguistics Olympiad (IOL) every year since 2009, and has competed in 14 olympiads. They have sent 88 participants in 22 teams, selected through UKLO. In competition, teams from the UK have brought home 44 medals (15 gold, 14 silver and 15 bronze), 5 team trophies (2 gold and 3 bronze), 1 first-place team cup, 5 best solution prizes, 17 honourable mentions, and 1 team contest honourable mention. In addition, the UK has sent 7 Repeat Medalists and 4 Dream Teams to the Hall of Fame. The UK Linguistics Olympiad was the host for the 2013 IOL, held at the Manchester Grammar School and chaired by Neil Sheldon. The competition in Manchester was featured on an edition of BBC Radio Four's Word of Mouth programme centring on language games.

== Format ==
The competition is divided into two rounds. Round 1 is open to all secondary school pupils, while Round 2 is invitation only.

10 linguistic data problems are posed in each year's Round 1 papers, with the Breakthrough paper being 1–3, Foundation 2–5, Intermediate 4–7, and Advanced 6–10. The intention is that each problem is harder than the previous. At Breakthrough, Foundation and Intermediate levels, participants may enter either individually or as part of a group of 2-4 students, and timings and conditions can be decided by schools. At the Advanced level, the competition must take the format of an individual, 2.5 hour test sat under controlled conditions. Certificates are awarded for top-scorers at each level, with the top 5% receiving Gold certificates, the next 10% Silver, and the next 20% Bronze.

As of 2022, winners of a Gold certificate at the Advanced level are invited to participate in Round 2. This is a 3.5 hour paper posing five more problems, some of which require written explanations. High-scoring students again receive certificates, with the top 25% receiving a Distinction, and the next 25% receiving a Merit. About twelve competitors are invited to attend a training camp at a host university, where eight competitors in two teams are selected to participate in the International Linguistics Olympiad and represent the UK. Selection is based mostly on performance in the Round 2 paper and the camp, but past performances at IOL and Round 2 are taken into account. Previously,^{1} roughly 16 of the top scorers from the Advanced paper were invited to participate in Round 2, which took the form of a residential training weekend at a host university, followed by the exam.

== IOL Teams ==
Since 2009, the UK has sent teams annually to the IOL.

=== IOL 2009 ===
2009 - Wrocław, Poland
Team	Name	Award
GB	Ben Caller	bronze medal
GB	Adam King	
GB	Ben Miller	
GB	Alex Sheppard	

Team Leader: Neil Sheldon

=== IOL 2010 ===
2010 - Stockholm, Sweden
Team	Name	Award
1	Craig Bohrson	honourable mention
1	Alison Coxon	
1	Imogen Nelson	
1	Younus Porteous	bronze medal
2	Helen Hambling	
2	Sarah O'Keeffe	
2	Carl Rietschel	honourable mention
2	Nathan Somers	best solution to question 5

Team Leader: Neil Sheldon

=== IOL 2011 ===
2011 - Pittsburgh, USA
Team	Name	Award
UK	Piotr Gałuszka	honourable mention
UK	Jessica Hao	
UK	Jake Lishman	
UK	Nik Moore	bronze medal

Team Leader: Neil Sheldon

=== IOL 2012 ===
2012 - Ljubljana, Slovenia
Team	Name	Award
UK	Melanie Duncan	bronze medal
UK	Omri Faraggi	bronze medal
UK	Baichuan Li	bronze medal
UK	Tom White	silver medal

Team Leader: Neil Sheldon

Note: This team was entered into the IOL Hall of Fame as a "Dream Team" because all members of the team received a medal.

=== IOL 2013 ===
2013 - Manchester, UK
Team	Name	Award
North	Omri Faraggi	silver medal
North	Harry Goodhew	honourable mention
North	Sam Heath	
North	Neema Kotonya	honourable mention
South	Daniel Pitt	honourable mention
South	Oliver Sayeed	
South	Theo Tindall	honourable mention
South	Elysia Warner	honourable mention

Team Leaders: Neil Sheldon and Nathan Somers

=== IOL 2014 ===
2014 - Beijing, China
Team	Name	Award
UK	Alastair Carr	honourable mention
UK	Jack Hodkinson	
UK	Oliver Sayeed	
UK	Elysia Warner	gold medal

Team Leader: Neil Sheldon

=== IOL 2015 ===
2015 - Blagoevgrad, Bulgaria
Team	Name	Award	Team Award
East	Samuel Ahmed	gold medal, 2nd place individual	
East	Samuel Hosegood		
East	Naomi Solomons	bronze medal	
East	Isobel Voysey	honourable mention	
West	Anthony Bracey	silver medal	gold trophy
West	Eimear McKnight	gold medal	gold trophy
West	Harry Taylor	honourable mention	gold trophy
West	Stephanie Wong	honourable mention	gold trophy

Team Leader: Neil Sheldon

=== IOL 2016 ===
2016 - Mysore, India
Team	Name	Award	Team Award
UK	Samuel Ahmed	gold medal	bronze trophy
UK	Zeki Dolen		bronze trophy
UK	Eimear McKnight	gold medal, 3rd place individual, best solution to question 1	bronze trophy
UK	Isobel Voysey	bronze medal	bronze trophy

Team Leader: Neil Sheldon

=== IOL 2017 ===
2017 - Dublin, Ireland
Team	Name	Award	Team Award
Team K	Samuel Ahmed	gold medal, 1st place individual	highest combined individual scores
Team K	Simeon Hellsten	gold medal	highest combined individual scores
Team K	Kamran Sharifi		highest combined individual scores
Team K	Harry Taylor	silver medal	highest combined individual scores
Team U	Benjamin Liow		
Team U	Eimear McKnight	gold medal, 3rd place individual	
Team U	Ben Morris	silver medal	
Team U	Alfie Vaughan		

Team Leaders: Neil Sheldon and Elysia Warner

=== IOL 2018 ===
2018 - Prague, Czechia
Team	Name	Award	Team Award
Team U	Eleanor Edwards		bronze trophy
Team U	Edmund Lea	bronze medal	bronze trophy
Team U	Selina Wang		bronze trophy
Team U	Sean White	bronze medal, best solution to question 3	bronze trophy
Team K	Simeon Hellsten	silver medal	"dream team"
Team K	Eimear McKnight	gold medal, 2nd place individual	"dream team"
Team K	Hari Prasad	bronze medal	"dream team"
Team K	Benedict Randall Shaw	gold medal	"dream team"

Team Leaders: Neil Sheldon and Elysia Warner

=== IOL 2019 ===
2019 - Yongin, South Korea
Team	Name	Award	Team Award
Team U	Sam Corner	gold medal	"dream team"
Team U	Kilian Meissner	bronze medal	"dream team"
Team U	Harrison Moore	silver medal	"dream team"
Team U	Alex Walker	bronze medal	"dream team"
Team K	Tommaso Leonardi		
Team K	Simeon Hellsten	gold medal	
Team K	Daniel Turaev	silver medal	
Team K	Benedict Randall Shaw	gold medal	

Team Leaders: Neil Sheldon and Graeme Trousdale

=== IOL 2020 ===
The IOL competition in 2020 was postponed until 2021 due to the COVID-19 pandemic. However, the UK still selected a squad of eight, consisting of Adrian Sahani, Benedict Randall Shaw, Hari Prasad, Kilian Meissner, Robbie Bennett, Sam Corner, Simeon Hellsten, and Soren Choi.

=== IOL 2021 ===
2021 - Ventspils, Latvia
Team	Name	Award	Team Award
Team U	Alex Robson	honourable mention, best solution to problem 4	honourable mention
Team U	Barnaby Alasdair Colvin		honourable mention
Team U	Harrison Moore	honourable mention	honourable mention
Team U	Toby Weston	honourable mention	honourable mention
Team K	Aanya Goyal	honourable mention	
Team K	Keira Cumming		
Team K	Toby Collins	bronze medal	
Team K	Xane Miles		

Team Leaders: Neil Sheldon and Graeme Trousdale

=== IOL 2022 ===
2022 - Castletown, Isle of Man
Team	Name	Award	Team Award
Team U	Alison Craig-Greene	gold medal, 3rd place individual	
Team U	Brendan Bethlehem	honourable mention	
Team U	George Zhou	silver medal	
Team U	Raka Chattopadhyay		
Team K	Alex Thompson		bronze trophy
Team K	Stratos Voudouris	silver medal	bronze trophy
Team K	Toby Collins	silver medal	bronze trophy
Team K	William Thomson	silver medal, best solution to problem 3	bronze trophy

Team Leaders: Neil Sheldon and Graeme Trousdale

=== IOL 2023 ===
2023 - Bansko, Bulgaria
Team	Name	Award	Team Award
UK	Eleanor Borrel	bronze medal	dream team, gold trophy
UK	Alison Craig-Greene	silver medal	dream team, gold trophy
UK	William Thomson	gold medal	dream team, gold trophy
UK	Daniel Titmas	silver medal	dream team, gold trophy

Team Leader: Graeme Trousdale. Observer: Simeon Hellsten

=== IOL 2024 ===
2024 - Brasília, Brazil
Team	Name	Award	Team Award
UK	Alison Craig-Greene	gold medal, 3rd place individual	honourable mention
UK	Yipeng Xu	gold medal, 4th place individual	honourable mention
UK	Claire Yen	bronze medal	honourable mention
UK	Max Fisher-Ayres	honourable mention	honourable mention

Team Leader: Simeon Hellsten. Observer: Daniel Turaev

== Notes ==
1.In 2021, the squad of 8 were selected from R2, and a planned training camp was cancelled due to the COVID-19 pandemic.
