= Ruslan Mitkov =

Lancaster University professor and leading researcher

- Education: Humboldt University; Technical University of Dresden
- Known for: Contributions to Anaphora Resolution, and automatic generation of multiple choice questions
- Scientific career
- Workplaces: Lancaster University; Institute of Mathematics and Informatics (Bulgarian Academy of Sciences); Saarland University; University of Hamburg
- Thesis: Beiträge zum computergestützten Wissenstesten (1987)
- Doctoral advisor: Nikolaus Joachim Lehmann

Ruslan Mitkov is a professor at Lancaster University, and a researcher in Natural Language Processing and Computational Linguistics. He completed his PhD at Technical University of Dresden under the supervision of Nikolaus Joachim Lehmann. He has published more than 240 refereed papers and is best known for his contributions to Anaphora Resolution, and his seminal work in computer-aided generation of multiple-choice tests among others.

Mitkov is the sole editor of the Oxford Handbook of Computational Linguistics (Oxford University Press) and the author of the book Anaphora Resolution (published by Longman), which have become standard textbooks in their fields. He is also the co-founder and editor-in-chief of the Cambridge journal Natural Language Engineering and the editor-in-chief of John Benjamins’ book series in Natural Language Processing.

== Selected works ==
- 1998. Robust pronoun resolution with limited knowledge, Proceedings of the 36th Annual Meeting of the Association for Computational Linguistics and 17th International Conference on Computational Linguistics-Volume 2
- 2001. Introduction to the special issue on computational anaphora resolution. Mitkov, Ruslan, Branimir Boguraev, and Shalom Lappin. Computational Linguistics 27.4 (2001): 473-477.
- 2003 Computer-aided generation of multiple-choice tests, Proceedings of the HLT-NAACL 03 workshop on Building educational applications using natural language processing-Volume 2

== Honors and awards ==
- 1993, 1994. Fellow of the Alexander von Humboldt Foundation
- 2002. Keynote speaker at CICLing conference
- 2011. Doctor Honoris Causa from Plovdiv University
- 2012. Keynote speaker at TSD conference
- 2014. Professor Honoris Causa from Veliko Tarnovo University
