= Lucia Specia =

Professor of Natural Language Processing

- Education: University of São Paulo
- Scientific career
- Fields: Natural language processing
- Workplaces: Epic Games; Xerox Research Centre Europe; University of Wolverhampton; University of Sheffield; Imperial College London; Dublin City University; Open University
- Thesis: A hybrid relational approach for word sense disambiguation in machine translation (2007)
- Doctoral advisor: Maria das Graças Volpe Nunes
- Website: profiles.imperial.ac.uk/l.specia

Lucia Specia is a British computer scientist, professor of natural language processing at Imperial College London, Director of Research Engineering at Epic Games and Chief Scientist at Contex.ai. She holds a joint position in language engineering at the University of Sheffield. Her research investigates data-driven approaches to natural language processing (NLP).

== Early life and education ==
Specia earned her PhD in computer science at the University of São Paulo in 2007 supervised by Maria das Graças Volpe Nunes from the Núcleo Interinstitucional de Linguística Computacional (NILC).

== Research and career ==
After earning her PhD, Specia moved to Xerox Research Centre Europe, where she worked as a research engineer. In 2010 Specia joined the University of Wolverhampton as a senior lecturer. She moved to the University of Sheffield in 2012, and Imperial College London in 2018. She took up a joint appointment at the ADAPT Centre at Dublin City University.

Specia specialises in natural language processing using multi-modal input data, quality estimations in machine learning and the intersection of language and vision. She developed QuEst, an open source software tool used for quality estimation for machine translation.

=== Awards and honours ===
Specia was awarded an Amazon Research Award in 2016, using which she investigated the quality of machine translation for product reviews. In 2016 Specia was awarded a European Research Council (ERC) starting grant to use multi-modal information as an input for machine learning algorithms.
