= North American Computational Linguistics Open Competition =

High school linguistics competition

The North American Computational Linguistics Open competition (NACLO), formerly called the North American Computational Linguistics Olympiad before January 1, 2020, is a computational linguistics competition for high school students in the United States and Canada that has been held since 2007. For the 2021 Open competition, approximately 1300 to 1400 students competed. Since 2008 the contest has consisted of two rounds, the second being administered to the top scorers in the first round. The top-scoring students on the second round qualify for the International Linguistics Olympiad (IOL), one of the international science olympiads.

== History ==
Since the mid-1960s, problem-solving competitions in linguistics for secondary school students have been taking place at various locations around the world. In Russia, the Moscow and St. Petersburg Linguistic Olympiads are credited with inspiring hundreds of young talented scholars to choose linguistics as an academic major and profession. Presently there are national contests in Europe, Asia, South America, Australia and Africa, as well as North America. NACLO is part of a consortium that shares resources with other English-speaking contests such as the United Kingdom Linguistics Olympiad, OzCLO (Australia) and the All-Ireland Linguistics Olympiad. There is also an International Linguistic Olympiad in which students from many countries compete, as well as dozens of local competitions held in individual towns and schools across Europe and the USA.

In 1998 the first US Linguistics Olympiad was held at the University of Oregon in Eugene, Oregon, in 1998. 18 students participated the first year, 88 participated the second year, and 67 participated the third year of this local pilot program. From 2001 to 2006, the program existed as an informal, web-based educational activity known as the Linguistics Challenge.

The two US teams in each year won several awards at the IOL in 2007 and 2008. Each year, one of the two US teams won a gold medal (or first diploma) in the team contest. In addition, several team members won individual medals.

In 2019, following a request from the US Olympic Committee that NACLO comply with the Amateur Sports Act of 1978 (aka the Ted Stevens Act), which grants exclusive rights of usage in the US of the words Olympic and Olympiad to the Olympic Committee, the contest agreed to change its name to the North American Computational Linguistics Open competition.

== Format ==
The format of the contest changed significantly between 2007 and 2008. The 2007 contest consisted of eight problems given in a single round open to all participants. The 2008 competition consisted of two rounds. The first round was open to all contestants and consisted of a three-hour, five-problem written examination. The top scorers on the open round advanced to the invitational round, which was a five-hour, seven-problem written examination divided into two parts; the first part lasted 3 and a half hours and contained five problems, while the second part lasted one and a half hour and contained two problems. The top eight scorers from the invitational round were selected to participate in the IOL. The booklets with problems and solutions are available on the main NACLO website.

== IOL qualifiers ==
From 2007 to 2010 the USA sent two teams annually to the IOL.

2007 - St. Petersburg, Russia
Team	Name	Award	Team award	Team leader
1	Adam Hesterberg	gold medal		Dragomir Radev, Lori Levin
1	Jeffrey Lim	best solution to problem 2		Dragomir Radev, Lori Levin
1	Ryan Musa			Dragomir Radev, Lori Levin
1	Rachel Zax			Dragomir Radev, Lori Levin
2	Josh Falk		gold medal	Dragomir Radev, Lori Levin
2	Rebecca Jacobs		gold medal	Dragomir Radev, Lori Levin
2	Michael Gottlieb		gold medal	Dragomir Radev, Lori Levin
2	Anna Tchetchetkine		gold medal	Dragomir Radev, Lori Levin

2009 - Wrocław, Poland
Team	Name	Award	Team award	Team leader
"Red"	Morris Alper	honorable mention	gold trophy	Dragomir Radev, Lori Levin
"Red"	Alan Huang	bronze medal, best solution to problem 1	gold trophy	Dragomir Radev, Lori Levin
"Red"	Rebecca Jacobs	silver medal	gold trophy	Dragomir Radev, Lori Levin
"Red"	Anand Natarajan	honorable mention	gold trophy	Dragomir Radev, Lori Levin
"Blue"	John Berman	bronze medal, best solution to problem 5		Dragomir Radev, Lori Levin
"Blue"	Sergei Bernstein	bronze medal		Dragomir Radev, Lori Levin
"Blue"	Daryl Hansen	honorable mention		Dragomir Radev, Lori Levin
"Blue"	Vivaek Shivakumar	honorable mention		Dragomir Radev, Lori Levin

2008 - Slantchev Bryag, Bulgaria
Team	Name	Award	Team award	Team leader
1	Josh Falk		silver trophy, cup for highest average score on the individual contest	Dragomir Radev, Lori Levin
1	Jeffrey Lim	bronze medal	silver trophy, cup for highest average score on the individual contest	Dragomir Radev, Lori Levin
1	Anand Natarajan	silver medal	silver trophy, cup for highest average score on the individual contest	Dragomir Radev, Lori Levin
1	Guy Tabachnick	bronze medal	silver trophy, cup for highest average score on the individual contest	Dragomir Radev, Lori Levin
2	Morris Alper	silver medal	gold trophy	Dragomir Radev, Lori Levin
2	Rebecca Jacobs	bronze medal	gold trophy	Dragomir Radev, Lori Levin
2	Jae-kyu Lee	best solution to problem 4	gold trophy	Dragomir Radev, Lori Levin
2	Hanzhi Zhu	gold medal, best solution to problem 1	gold trophy	Dragomir Radev, Lori Levin

2010 - Stockholm, Sweden
Team	Name	Award	Team award	Team leader
"Red"	Ben Sklaroff	gold medal, best solution to problem 4	3rd highest combined individual scores	Dragomir Radev, Lori Levin
"Red"	Allen Yuan	silver medal	3rd highest combined individual scores	Dragomir Radev, Lori Levin
"Red"	In-Sung Na	honorable mention	3rd highest combined individual scores	Dragomir Radev, Lori Levin
"Red"	Brian Kong	honorable mention	3rd highest combined individual scores	Dragomir Radev, Lori Levin
"Blue"	Martin Camacho	silver medal, best solution to problem 2	highest combined individual scores	Dragomir Radev, Lori Levin
"Blue"	Tian-Yi Damien Jiang	silver medal, best solution to problem 1	highest combined individual scores	Dragomir Radev, Lori Levin
"Blue"	Alexander Iriza	bronze medal	highest combined individual scores	Dragomir Radev, Lori Levin
"Blue"	Alan Chang	bronze medal	highest combined individual scores	Dragomir Radev, Lori Levin

In 2011 the USA sent three teams, and Canada also sent a team.

2011 - Pittsburgh, USA
Country	Team	Name	Award	Team award	Team leader
USA	"Red"	Aaron Klein	bronze medal	gold trophy, highest combined individual scores	Dragomir Radev
USA	"Red"	Wesley Jones	silver medal	gold trophy, highest combined individual scores	Dragomir Radev
USA	"Red"	Duligur Ibeling	silver medal	gold trophy, highest combined individual scores	Dragomir Radev
USA	"Red"	Morris Alper	gold medal, best solution to problem 2	gold trophy, highest combined individual scores	Dragomir Radev
USA	"White"	Erik Andersen	honorable mention		Dragomir Radev
USA	"White"	Allen Yuan	silver medal		Dragomir Radev
USA	"White"	Chelsea Voss	honorable mention		Dragomir Radev
USA	"White"	Arjun Srinivasan	honorable mention		Dragomir Radev
USA	"Blue"	Alexander Wade	silver medal, best solution to problem 4		Dragomir Radev
USA	"Blue"	Ophir Lifshitz	honorable mention		Dragomir Radev
USA	"Blue"	Caroline Ellison	honorable mention, best solution to problem 3		Dragomir Radev
USA	"Blue"	Rachel McEnroe			Dragomir Radev
Canada		Keunjae Go			Patrick Littell
Canada		Jordan Ho			Patrick Littell
Canada		Daniel Mitropolsky	bronze medal		Patrick Littell
Canada		William Zhang	honorable mention		Patrick Littell

From 2012 to 2016, the USA sent two teams annually, and Canada sent one team annually.

2012 - Ljubljana, Slovenia
Country	Team	Name	Award	Team Award	Team leader
USA	"Red"	Darryl Wu	silver medal, best solution to problem 1	2nd highest combined individual scores	Dragomir Radev, Lori Levin
USA	"Red"	Anderson Wang	gold medal, best solution to problem 4	2nd highest combined individual scores	Dragomir Radev, Lori Levin
USA	"Red"	Samuel Zbarsky	honorable mention	2nd highest combined individual scores	Dragomir Radev, Lori Levin
USA	"Red"	Allan Sadun	silver medal	2nd highest combined individual scores	Dragomir Radev, Lori Levin
USA	"Blue"	Alexander Wade	gold medal, best solution to problem 3, best solution to problem 5	gold trophy, 3rd highest combined individual scores	Dragomir Radev, Lori Levin
USA	"Blue"	Aaron Klein	silver medal	gold trophy, 3rd highest combined individual scores	Dragomir Radev, Lori Levin
USA	"Blue"	Aidan Kaplan		gold trophy, 3rd highest combined individual scores	Dragomir Radev, Lori Levin
USA	"Blue"	Erik Andersen	bronze medal	gold trophy, 3rd highest combined individual scores	Dragomir Radev, Lori Levin
Canada		Simon Huang			Patrick Littell
Canada		Keunjae Go	honorable mention		Patrick Littell
Canada		David Penco			Patrick Littell
Canada		Qin Long			Patrick Littell

2013 - Manchester, UK
Country	Team	Name	Award	Team Award	Team leader
USA	Red	Aaron Klein	silver medal	gold trophy, highest combined individual scores	Dragomir Radev, Lori Levin
USA	Red	Max Schindler	bronze medal	gold trophy, highest combined individual scores	Dragomir Radev, Lori Levin
USA	Red	Alexander Wade	gold medal	gold trophy, highest combined individual scores	Dragomir Radev, Lori Levin
USA	Red	Tom McCoy	bronze medal	gold trophy, highest combined individual scores	Dragomir Radev, Lori Levin
USA	Blue	Rebecca Burks	honorable mention		Dragomir Radev, Lori Levin
USA	Blue	Jeffrey Ling	silver medal		Dragomir Radev, Lori Levin
USA	Blue	Erik Andersen	honorable mention		Dragomir Radev, Lori Levin
USA	Blue	Simone Stoyen			Dragomir Radev, Lori Levin
Canada		Jordan Ho			Patrick Littell
Canada		Janis Chang			Patrick Littell
Canada		Daniel Lovsted	bronze medal		Patrick Littell
Canada		Stella Lau	honorable mention		Patrick Littell

2014 - Beijing, China
Country	Team	Name	Award	Team Award	Team leader
USA	"Red"	Darryl Wu	gold medal, 2nd place individual, best solution to problem 2	gold trophy, highest combined individual scores	Dragomir Radev, Lori Levin
USA	"Red"	Jackie Bredenberg	honorable mention	gold trophy, highest combined individual scores	Dragomir Radev, Lori Levin
USA	"Red"	Alexander Babiak	silver medal	gold trophy, highest combined individual scores	Dragomir Radev, Lori Levin
USA	"Red"	Deven Lahoti	silver medal	gold trophy, highest combined individual scores	Dragomir Radev, Lori Levin
USA	"Blue"	David Sokratov	honorable mention		Dragomir Radev, Lori Levin
USA	"Blue"	James Bloxham	bronze medal		Dragomir Radev, Lori Levin
USA	"Blue"	Kevin Li	bronze medal		Dragomir Radev, Lori Levin
USA	"Blue"	Catherine Wu	silver medal, best solution to problem 4		Dragomir Radev, Lori Levin
Canada		Daniel Lovsted	gold medal, 3rd place individual	2nd highest combined individual scores	Heather Newell
Canada		Yan Huang	silver medal	2nd highest combined individual scores	Heather Newell
Canada		Simon Huang	bronze medal	2nd highest combined individual scores	Heather Newell
Canada		Minh-Tam Nguyen	honorable mention	2nd highest combined individual scores	Heather Newell

2015 - Blagoevgrad, Bulgaria
Country	Team	Name	Award	Team Award	Team leader
USA	"Red"	James Bloxham	gold medal, 3rd place individual, best solution to problem 3	silver trophy, highest combined individual scores	Dragomir Radev, Lori Levin
USA	"Red"	Conor Stuart-Roe	silver medal	silver trophy, highest combined individual scores	Dragomir Radev, Lori Levin
USA	"Red"	James Wedgwood	gold medal, 1st place individual, best solution to problem 5	silver trophy, highest combined individual scores	Dragomir Radev, Lori Levin
USA	"Red"	Kevin Yang	gold medal	silver trophy, highest combined individual scores	Dragomir Radev, Lori Levin
USA	"Blue"	Julian Gau	silver medal	3rd highest combined individual scores	Dragomir Radev, Lori Levin
USA	"Blue"	Kevin Q Li	honorable mention	3rd highest combined individual scores	Dragomir Radev, Lori Levin
USA	"Blue"	Kevin M Li	silver medal	3rd highest combined individual scores	Dragomir Radev, Lori Levin
USA	"Blue"	Nilai Sarda	bronze medal	3rd highest combined individual scores	Dragomir Radev, Lori Levin
Canada		Ben Zhang	honorable mention		Pat Littell
Canada		Ella Bei			Pat Littell
Canada		Emma McLean	bronze medal		Pat Littell
Canada		James Hyett	honorable mention		Pat Littell

2016 - Mysore, India
Country	Team	Name	Award	Team Award	Team leader
USA	"Red"	Laurestine Irene Bradford	honorable mention	highest combined individual scores	Dragomir Radev, Aleka Blackwell
USA	"Red"	James Wedgwood	gold medal, 2nd place individual	highest combined individual scores	Dragomir Radev, Aleka Blackwell
USA	"Red"	Erik Metz	silver medal	highest combined individual scores	Dragomir Radev, Aleka Blackwell
USA	"Red"	Shuheng "Nelson" Niu	silver medal	highest combined individual scores	Dragomir Radev, Aleka Blackwell
USA	"Blue"	Margarita Misirpashayeva	silver medal		Dragomir Radev, Aleka Blackwell
USA	"Blue"	Wyatt R. Reeves	bronze medal		Dragomir Radev, Aleka Blackwell
USA	"Blue"	Jenna LaFleur	honorable mention		Dragomir Radev, Aleka Blackwell
USA	"Blue"	Siye "Annie" Zhu	bronze medal		Dragomir Radev, Aleka Blackwell
Canada		Kevin Sun	honorable mention, best solution to problem 1		Heather Newell
Canada		Minh-Tam Nguyen	honorable mention		Heather Newell
Canada		Lawrence Pang			Heather Newell
Canada		James Hogan	honorable mention		Heather Newell

From 2017 to 2022, the USA sent two teams and Canada sent two teams, one francophone and one anglophone.

2017 - Dublin, Ireland
Country	Team	Name	Award	Team Award	Team Leader
USA	"Red"	Brian Xiao	gold medal, best solution to problem 3		Aleka Blackwell, Lori Levin, Dragomir Radev
USA	"Red"	Andrew Tockman	silver medal		Aleka Blackwell, Lori Levin, Dragomir Radev
USA	"Red"	Ziyan Lei	silver medal		Aleka Blackwell, Lori Levin, Dragomir Radev
USA	"Red"	Siye Zhu	bronze medal		Aleka Blackwell, Lori Levin, Dragomir Radev
USA	"Blue"	Joseph Feffer	silver medal		Aleka Blackwell, Lori Levin, Dragomir Radev
USA	"Blue"	Sonia Reilly	bronze medal		Aleka Blackwell, Lori Levin, Dragomir Radev
USA	"Blue"	Vanessa Hu			Aleka Blackwell, Lori Levin, Dragomir Radev
USA	"Blue"	Wesley Zhang			Aleka Blackwell, Lori Levin, Dragomir Radev
Canada	"Castors" (French)	Antonin Benoit			Heather Newell, Daniel Lovsted
Canada	"Castors" (French)	Corinne Soucy			Heather Newell, Daniel Lovsted
Canada	"Castors" (French)	Georges Awaad			Heather Newell, Daniel Lovsted
Canada	"Castors" (French)	Samuel Ouvrard			Heather Newell, Daniel Lovsted
Canada	"Moose" (English)	Gabriel Kammer			Heather Newell, Daniel Lovsted
Canada	"Moose" (English)	James Hogan			Heather Newell, Daniel Lovsted
Canada	"Moose" (English)	Jane Li			Heather Newell, Daniel Lovsted
Canada	"Moose" (English)	Kevin Liang			Heather Newell, Daniel Lovsted

2018 - Prague, Czech Republic
Country	Team	Name	Award	Team Award	Team Leader
USA	"Red"	Ethan A. Chi	silver medal	silver trophy	Aleka Blackwell, Lori Levin, Dragomir Radev
USA	"Red"	Swapnil Garg	gold medal, best solution to problem 5	silver trophy	Aleka Blackwell, Lori Levin, Dragomir Radev
USA	"Red"	Andrew Tockman	gold medal, best solution to problem 1	silver trophy	Aleka Blackwell, Lori Levin, Dragomir Radev
USA	"Red"	Brian Xiao	bronze medal	silver trophy	Aleka Blackwell, Lori Levin, Dragomir Radev
USA	"Blue"	Russell Emerine	silver medal	gold trophy, highest combined individual scores	Aleka Blackwell, Lori Levin, Dragomir Radev
USA	"Blue"	Pranav Krishna	gold medal	gold trophy, highest combined individual scores	Aleka Blackwell, Lori Levin, Dragomir Radev
USA	"Blue"	Benjamin LaFond	gold medal	gold trophy, highest combined individual scores	Aleka Blackwell, Lori Levin, Dragomir Radev
USA	"Blue"	Mihir Singhal	silver medal	gold trophy, highest combined individual scores	Aleka Blackwell, Lori Levin, Dragomir Radev
Canada	"Castors" (French)	Georges Awaad			Daniel Lovsted, Andrés Pablo Salanova, Gustavo Beritognolo
Canada	"Castors" (French)	Yeryomin George			Daniel Lovsted, Andrés Pablo Salanova, Gustavo Beritognolo
Canada	"Castors" (French)	Samson Nathan			Daniel Lovsted, Andrés Pablo Salanova, Gustavo Beritognolo
Canada	"Castors" (French)	Corinne Soucy			Daniel Lovsted, Andrés Pablo Salanova, Gustavo Beritognolo
Canada	"Moose" (English)	Ken Jiang	bronze medal		Daniel Lovsted, Andrés Pablo Salanova, Gustavo Beritognolo
Canada	"Moose" (English)	Shuli Jones	honorable mention		Daniel Lovsted, Andrés Pablo Salanova, Gustavo Beritognolo
Canada	"Moose" (English)	Nathan Kim			Daniel Lovsted, Andrés Pablo Salanova, Gustavo Beritognolo
Canada	"Moose" (English)	Kevin Liang	bronze medal		Daniel Lovsted, Andrés Pablo Salanova, Gustavo Beritognolo

2019 - Yongin, South Korea
Country	Team	Name	Award	Team Award	Team Leader
USA	"Red"	Wesley Zhang	gold medal, best solution to problem 5, 2nd place individual	highest combined individual scores	Aleka Blackwell, Lori Levin, Dragomir Radev
USA	"Red"	Andrew Tockman	gold medal	highest combined individual scores	Aleka Blackwell, Lori Levin, Dragomir Radev
USA	"Red"	Ziyan Lei	silver medal	highest combined individual scores	Aleka Blackwell, Lori Levin, Dragomir Radev
USA	"Red"	Russell Emerine	silver medal	highest combined individual scores	Aleka Blackwell, Lori Levin, Dragomir Radev
USA	"Blue"	Skyelar Raiti	silver medal		Aleka Blackwell, Lori Levin, Dragomir Radev
USA	"Blue"	Pranav Krishna	silver medal		Aleka Blackwell, Lori Levin, Dragomir Radev
USA	"Blue"	Jeremy Zhou	silver medal		Aleka Blackwell, Lori Levin, Dragomir Radev
USA	"Blue"	Katherine He	honorable mention		Aleka Blackwell, Lori Levin, Dragomir Radev
Canada	"Castors" (French)	Jonathan Deschênes			Patrick Littell, Andrés Pablo Salanova, Corinne Soucy
Canada	"Castors" (French)	Geneviève Fournier			Patrick Littell, Andrés Pablo Salanova, Corinne Soucy
Canada	"Castors" (French)	Florence Lefebvre			Patrick Littell, Andrés Pablo Salanova, Corinne Soucy
Canada	"Castors" (French)	Ariel P. Soucy			Patrick Littell, Andrés Pablo Salanova, Corinne Soucy
Canada	"Moose" (English)	Ken Jiang	gold medal, best solution to problem 1, 1st place individual	3rd highest combined individual score	Patrick Littell, Andrés Pablo Salanova, Corinne Soucy
Canada	"Moose" (English)	Tianqi Jiang	silver medal	3rd highest combined individual score	Patrick Littell, Andrés Pablo Salanova, Corinne Soucy
Canada	"Moose" (English)	Nathan Kim	silver medal	3rd highest combined individual score	Patrick Littell, Andrés Pablo Salanova, Corinne Soucy
Canada	"Moose" (English)	Zed Li	honorable mention	3rd highest combined individual score	Patrick Littell, Andrés Pablo Salanova, Corinne Soucy

2021 - Ventspils, Latvia
Country	Team	Name	Award	Team Award	Team Leader
USA	"Red"	Jonathan Huang	gold medal	silver trophy	Aleka Blackwell, Lori Levin, Dragomir Radev
USA	"Red"	Evelyn Sun	honorable mention	silver trophy	Aleka Blackwell, Lori Levin, Dragomir Radev
USA	"Red"	Riley Kong	bronze medal	silver trophy	Aleka Blackwell, Lori Levin, Dragomir Radev
USA	"Red"	Lydia Wang		silver trophy	Aleka Blackwell, Lori Levin, Dragomir Radev
USA	"Blue"	Jeremy Zhou	bronze medal	honorable mention	Aleka Blackwell, Lori Levin, Dragomir Radev
USA	"Blue"	Adithya Ram Kalyanam	honorable mention	honorable mention	Aleka Blackwell, Lori Levin, Dragomir Radev
USA	"Blue"	Jonathan Song	bronze medal	honorable mention	Aleka Blackwell, Lori Levin, Dragomir Radev
USA	"Blue"	Benjamin Myer Neithardt	bronze medal	honorable mention	Aleka Blackwell, Lori Levin, Dragomir Radev
Canada	"Castors" (French)	Bogdan-Alexandru Sava			Patrick Littell, Andrés Pablo Salanova, Corinne Soucy
Canada	"Castors" (French)	Ariel Soucy			Patrick Littell, Andrés Pablo Salanova, Corinne Soucy
Canada	"Castors" (French)	Yiyuan Zhang			Patrick Littell, Andrés Pablo Salanova, Corinne Soucy
Canada	"Castors" (French)	Aron Szocs			Patrick Littell, Andrés Pablo Salanova, Corinne Soucy
Canada	"Moose" (English)	Thomas Frith	bronze medal		Patrick Littell, Andrés Pablo Salanova, Corinne Soucy
Canada	"Moose" (English)	Kunaal Chandrashekar	honorable mention		Patrick Littell, Andrés Pablo Salanova, Corinne Soucy
Canada	"Moose" (English)	Ellina Zhang			Patrick Littell, Andrés Pablo Salanova, Corinne Soucy
Canada	"Moose" (English)	Leo Tenenbaum			Patrick Littell, Andrés Pablo Salanova, Corinne Soucy

2022 - Castletown, Isle of Man
Country	Team	Name	Award	Team Award	Team Leader
USA	"Red"	Benjamin Mcavoy-Bickford	silver medal	bronze trophy	Aleka Blackwell, Lori Levin, Dragomir Radev
USA	"Red"	Luke Robitaille	gold medal	bronze trophy	Aleka Blackwell, Lori Levin, Dragomir Radev
USA	"Red"	Riley Kong	silver medal	bronze trophy	Aleka Blackwell, Lori Levin, Dragomir Radev
USA	"Red"	Rishab Parthasarathy	silver medal	bronze trophy	Aleka Blackwell, Lori Levin, Dragomir Radev
USA	"Blue"	Arul Kolla			Aleka Blackwell, Lori Levin, Dragomir Radev
USA	"Blue"	Emmy Bonser	honorable mention		Aleka Blackwell, Lori Levin, Dragomir Radev
USA	"Blue"	Grant Wang			Aleka Blackwell, Lori Levin, Dragomir Radev
USA	"Blue"	Tapas Gobalakrishna			Aleka Blackwell, Lori Levin, Dragomir Radev
Canada	"Castors" (French)	Bogdan Sava			Patrick Littell, Andrés Pablo Salanova, Corinne Soucy
Canada	"Castors" (French)	Cédric Campeau			Patrick Littell, Andrés Pablo Salanova, Corinne Soucy
Canada	"Castors" (French)	Isabella Zhang			Patrick Littell, Andrés Pablo Salanova, Corinne Soucy
Canada	"Castors" (French)	Serine F Shin			Patrick Littell, Andrés Pablo Salanova, Corinne Soucy
Canada	"Moose" (English)	Aidan Wang	bronze medal		Patrick Littell, Andrés Pablo Salanova, Corinne Soucy
Canada	"Moose" (English)	Kevin Yan	bronze medal		Patrick Littell, Andrés Pablo Salanova, Corinne Soucy
Canada	"Moose" (English)	Kunaal Chandrashekar	silver medal		Patrick Littell, Andrés Pablo Salanova, Corinne Soucy
Canada	"Moose" (English)	Perry Dai			Patrick Littell, Andrés Pablo Salanova, Corinne Soucy

2023 - Bansko, Bulgaria
Country	Team	Name	Award	Team Award	Team Leader
USA	"Red"	Arul Kolla	Bronze Medal	Silver Trophy	Aleka Blackwell, Lori Levin
USA	"Red"	Deeraj Pothapragada	Silver Medal	Silver Trophy	Aleka Blackwell, Lori Levin
USA	"Red"	Grant Wang		Silver Trophy	Aleka Blackwell, Lori Levin
USA	"Red"	Darren Su	Bronze Medal	Silver Trophy	Aleka Blackwell, Lori Levin
USA	"Blue"	Benjamin Yang	Bronze Medal		Aleka Blackwell, Lori Levin
USA	"Blue"	Soren Schmidt	Bronze Medal		Aleka Blackwell, Lori Levin
USA	"Blue"	Jingyuan Li	Honorable Mention		Aleka Blackwell, Lori Levin
USA	"Blue"	Mritika Senthil			Aleka Blackwell, Lori Levin
Canada	"Castors" (French)	Bogdan Sava		Silver Trophy	Patrick Littell, Andrés Pablo Salanova, Corinne Soucy
Canada	"Castors" (French)	Félix Von Veh		Silver Trophy	Patrick Littell, Andrés Pablo Salanova, Corinne Soucy
Canada	"Castors" (French)	Nina Geng		Silver Trophy	Patrick Littell, Andrés Pablo Salanova, Corinne Soucy
Canada	"Castors" (French)	Amelia Geng		Silver Trophy	Patrick Littell, Andrés Pablo Salanova, Corinne Soucy
Canada	"Moose" (English)	Kunaal Chandrashekar	Gold Medal	Silver Trophy	Patrick Littell, Andrés Pablo Salanova, Corinne Soucy
Canada	"Moose" (English)	Sukrith Velmineti	Silver Medal	Silver Trophy	Patrick Littell, Andrés Pablo Salanova, Corinne Soucy
Canada	"Moose" (English)	Perry Dai	Bronze Medal	Silver Trophy	Patrick Littell, Andrés Pablo Salanova, Corinne Soucy
Canada	"Moose" (English)	Victoria Li	Honorable Mention	Silver Trophy	Patrick Littell, Andrés Pablo Salanova, Corinne Soucy

2024 - Brasília, Brazil
Country	Team	Name	Award	Team Award	Team Leader
USA	"Red"	Jonathan Sakunkoo			Lori Levin, Robin Hammer
USA	"Red"	Deeraj Pothapragada	Gold Medal, 1st place individual		Lori Levin, Robin Hammer
USA	"Red"	Jonathan Ding			Lori Levin, Robin Hammer
USA	"Red"	Aaron Chai			Lori Levin, Robin Hammer
USA	"Blue"	Kevin Wang	Honorable Mention		Lori Levin, Robin Hammer
USA	"Blue"	Devin Joe	Gold Medal, 2nd place individual		Lori Levin, Robin Hammer
USA	"Blue"	Varin Sikka	Gold Medal		Lori Levin, Robin Hammer
USA	"Blue"	Linus Law			Lori Levin, Robin Hammer
Canada	"Castors" (French)	Maya Janzen			Corinne Soucy, Ken Jiang
Canada	"Castors" (French)	Mingzhe Li			Corinne Soucy, Ken Jiang
Canada	"Castors" (French)	Serine Shin			Corinne Soucy, Ken Jiang
Canada	"Castors" (French)	Jade Diwan			Corinne Soucy, Ken Jiang
Canada	"Moose" (English)	Marvin Mao	Silver Medal		Corinne Soucy, Ken Jiang
Canada	"Moose" (English)	Aidan Wang	Honorable Mention		Corinne Soucy, Ken Jiang
Canada	"Moose" (English)	Perry Dai			Corinne Soucy, Ken Jiang
Canada	"Moose" (English)	Sophia Davis Morris			Corinne Soucy, Ken Jiang

2025 - Taipei, Taiwan
Country	Team	Name	Award	Team Award	Team Leader
USA	"Red"	Devin Joe	Gold Medal		Patrick Littell, Arul Kolla
USA	"Red"	Denys Tereshchenko	Honorable Mention		Patrick Littell, Arul Kolla
USA	"Red"	Kyle Zhang	Gold Medal		Patrick Littell, Arul Kolla
USA	"Red"	Nicla Marabito	Bronze Medal		Patrick Littell, Arul Kolla
USA	"Blue"	Jason Liu	Silver Medal		Patrick Littell, Arul Kolla
USA	"Blue"	Ethan Reames			Patrick Littell, Arul Kolla
USA	"Blue"	Aaron Chai	Gold Medal, 2nd place individual		Patrick Littell, Arul Kolla
USA	"Blue"	Nina Stadermann	Bronze Medal		Patrick Littell, Arul Kolla
Canada	"Castors" (French)	Lillian Yamamura Gonçalves			Corinne Soucy, Ken Jiang
Canada	"Castors" (French)	Serine Shin			Corinne Soucy, Ken Jiang
Canada	"Castors" (French)	Felix Li			Corinne Soucy, Ken Jiang
Canada	"Castors" (French)	Charles Williamson			Corinne Soucy, Ken Jiang
Canada	"Moose" (English)	Sophia Davis Morris	Bronze Medal		Corinne Soucy, Ken Jiang
Canada	"Moose" (English)	Yiling Jiang	Bronze Medal		Corinne Soucy, Ken Jiang
Canada	"Moose" (English)	Aidan Wang	Honorable Mention		Corinne Soucy, Ken Jiang
Canada	"Moose" (English)	Xin Yan Dong	Gold Medal		Corinne Soucy, Ken Jiang

== See also ==
- International Linguistics Olympiad
- United States of America Computing Olympiad
- USA Biology Olympiad
- United States National Chemistry Olympiad
- United States of America Mathematical Olympiad
- Physics Olympiad
- United Kingdom Linguistics Olympiad
