= List of computer science conferences =

This is a list of current and past academic conferences in computer science. Only conferences with separate articles are included; within each field, the conferences are listed alphabetically by their short names.

== General ==
- FCRC – Federated Computing Research Conference

== Algorithms and theory ==
Conferences accepting a broad range of topics from theoretical computer science, including algorithms, data structures, computability, computational complexity, automata theory and formal languages:

- CCC - Computational Complexity Conference
- FCT – International Symposium on Fundamentals of Computation Theory
- FOCS – IEEE Symposium on Foundations of Computer Science
- ICALP – International Colloquium on Automata, Languages and Programming
- ISAAC – International Symposium on Algorithms and Computation
- STACS – Symposium on Theoretical Aspects of Computer Science
- STOC – ACM Symposium on Theory of Computing

=== Algorithms ===
Conferences whose topic is algorithms and data structures considered broadly, but that do not include other areas of theoretical computer science such as computational complexity theory:

- ESA – European Symposium on Algorithms
- SODA – ACM–SIAM Symposium on Discrete Algorithms
- SWAT and WADS – SWAT and WADS conferences

=== Geometric algorithms ===
Conferences on computational geometry, graph drawing, and other application areas of geometric computing:

- GD – International Symposium on Graph Drawing
- SoCG – Symposium on Computational Geometry

=== Other specialized subtopics ===
- CIAA – International Conference on Implementation and Application of Automata
- CCC – Computational Complexity Conference
- DCFS – International Workshop on Descriptional Complexity of Formal Systems
- DLT – International Conference on Developments in Language Theory
- ISSAC – International Symposium on Symbolic and Algebraic Computation
- RP – International Conference on Reachability Problems
- SEA – Symposium on Experimental Algorithms

== Languages and software ==
=== Programming languages ===
Conferences on programming languages, programming language theory and compilers:

- CC International Conference on Compiler Construction
- ESOP – ETAPS European Symposium on Programming
- HOPL – ACM SIGPLAN History of Programming Languages Conference
- ICFP – ACM SIGPLAN International Conference on Functional Programming
- ICLP – ALP International Conference on Logic Programming
- OOPSLA – ACM SIGPLAN Conference on Object-Oriented Programming, Systems, Languages, and Applications
- POPL – ACM SIGPLAN-SIGACT Symposium on Principles of Programming Languages
- PLDI – ACM SIGPLAN Conference on Programming Language Design and Implementation

=== Software engineering ===
Conferences on software engineering:

- ASE – IEEE/ACM International Conference on Automated Software Engineering
- ICSE – International Conference on Software Engineering
- ICSR – International Conference on Software Reuse
- ISSRE – IEEE International Symposium on Software Reliability Engineering
- FASE – ETAPS International Conference on Fundamental Approaches to Software Engineering
- WWDC - Worldwide Developers Conference

=== Formal methods and logic ===
Conferences on formal methods (including formal verification), logic, and automated reasoning:

- CAV – Computer Aided Verification
- FORTE – IFIP International Conference on Formal Techniques for Networked and Distributed Systems
- FoSSaCS – ETAPS International Conference on Foundations of Software Science and Computation Structures
- IJCAR - International Joint Conference on Automated Reasoning
- LICS – ACM–IEEE Symposium on Logic in Computer Science
- LPAR - International Conference on Logic for Programming, Artificial Intelligence and Reasoning
- TACAS – ETAPS International Conference on Tools and Algorithms for the Construction and Analysis of Systems
- RuleML - RuleML Symposium
- WoLLIC - Workshop on Logic, Language, Information and Computation

== Concurrent, distributed and parallel computing ==
Conferences on concurrent, distributed, and parallel computing, fault-tolerant systems, and dependable systems:

- CONCUR - International Conference on Concurrency Theory
- DISC - International Symposium on Distributed Computing
- DSN - International Conference on Dependable Systems and Networks
- ICDCS - IEEE International Conference on Distributed Computing Systems
- IPDPS - IEEE International Parallel and Distributed Processing Symposium
- PODC - ACM Symposium on Principles of Distributed Computing
- SIROCCO - International Colloquium on Structural Information and Communication Complexity
- SPAA - ACM Symposium on Parallelism in Algorithms and Architectures
- SRDS - IEEE International Symposium on Reliable Distributed Systems

=== High-performance computing ===
Conferences on high-performance computing, cluster computing, and grid computing:

- HiPC - International Conference on High Performance Computing
- SC - ACM/IEEE International Conference for High Performance Computing, Networking, Storage, and Analysis

== Operating systems ==
Conferences on operating systems, storage systems and middleware:

- ATC - ACM SIGOPS Annual Technical Conference
- SOSP - ACM Symposium on Operating Systems Principles
- OSDI - USENIX Symposium on Operating Systems Design and Implementation

== Computer architecture ==
Conferences on computer architecture:

- ASPLOS - International Conference on Architectural Support for Programming Languages and Operating Systems
- HPCA - IEEE International Symposium on High-Performance Computer Architecture
- ISSCC — International Solid-State Circuits Conference
- ISCA - International Symposium on Computer Architecture
- MICRO - IEEE/ACM International Symposium on Microarchitecture

=== Computer-aided design ===
Conferences on computer-aided design and electronic design automation:

- ASP-DAC - Asia and South Pacific Design Automation Conference
- DAC - Design Automation Conference
- DATE - Design, Automation, and Test in Europe
- ICCAD - International Conference on Computer-Aided Design
- ISPD - International Symposium on Physical Design

== Computer networking ==
Conferences on computer networking:

- NSDI - USENIX Symposium on Networked Systems Design and Implementation
- GlobeCom - IEEE Global Communications Conference
- ICC - IEEE International Conference on Communications
- SIGMETRICS - ACM SIGMETRICS

=== Wireless networks and mobile computing ===
Wireless networks and mobile computing, including ubiquitous and pervasive computing, wireless ad hoc networks and wireless sensor networks:

- EWSN - European Conference on Wireless Sensor Networks
- ISWC - International Symposium on Wearable Computers

== Security and privacy ==
Conferences on computer security and privacy:

- CCS - Computer and Communications Security
- DSN - International Conference on Dependable Systems and Networks
- NDSS - Network and Distributed System Security
- S&P - IEEE Symposium on Security and Privacy
- USENIX Security - USENIX Security Symposium

=== Cryptography ===
Cryptography conferences:

- ANTS - Algorithmic Number Theory Symposium
- RSA - RSA Conference

== Data management ==
Conferences on databases, information systems, information retrieval, data mining and the World Wide Web:

- BTW - GI Conference on Database Systems for Business, Technology and Web
- ECIR - European Conference on Information Retrieval
- ECIS - European Conference on Information Systems
- ER - International Conference on Conceptual Modeling
- ICDT - International Conference on Database Theory
- ICIS - International Conference on Information Systems
- ISWC - International Semantic Web Conference
- JCDL - ACM/IEEE Joint Conference on Digital Libraries
- PODS - ACM Symposium on Principles of Database Systems
- SIGMOD - ACM Special Interest Group on Management of Data
- WWW - World Wide Web Conference

== Artificial intelligence ==
Conferences on artificial intelligence and machine learning:

- AAAI - AAAI Conference on Artificial Intelligence
- AAMAS - International Conference on Autonomous Agents and Multiagent Systems
- ICAPS - International Conference on Automated Planning and Scheduling
- CIBB - International Conference on Computational Intelligence Methods for Bioinformatics and Biostatistics
- ECAI - European Conference on Artificial Intelligence
- ECML PKDD - European Conference on Machine Learning and Principles and Practice of Knowledge Discovery in Databases
- ICML - International Conference on Machine Learning
- ICLR - International Conference on Learning Representations
- IJCAI - International Joint Conference on Artificial Intelligence
- ISWC - International Semantic Web Conference
- NeurIPS - Conference on Neural Information Processing Systems

=== Evolutionary computation ===
Conferences on Evolutionary computation.

- CEC - IEEE Congress on Evolutionary Computation
- EvoStar
- FOGA - Foundations of Genetic Algorithms
- GECCO - Genetic and Evolutionary Computation Conference
- PPSN - Parallel Problem Solving from Nature

=== Computer vision ===
Conferences on computer vision (including also image analysis) and pattern recognition:

- CVPR - IEEE Conference on Computer Vision and Pattern Recognition
- ECCV - European Conference on Computer Vision
- ICCV - International Conference on Computer Vision
- SCIA - Scandinavian Conference on Image Analysis

=== Natural language processing ===
Conferences on computational linguistics and natural language processing:

- EMNLP - Empirical Methods in Natural Language Processing
- COLING - International Committee on Computational Linguistics
- TSD - Text, Speech and Dialogue
- CICLing - International Conference on Intelligent Text Processing and Computational Linguistics

== Computer graphics ==
Conferences on computer graphics, geometry processing, image processing, and multimedia:

- MM - ACM International Conference on Multimedia
- SGP - Symposium on Geometry Processing
- SIGGRAPH - International Conference on Computer Graphics and Interactive Techniques

== Human–computer interaction ==
Conferences on human–computer interaction and user interfaces:

- CHI - ACM Conference on Human Factors in Computing Systems
- GI - Graphics Interface
- MobileHCI - Conference on Human-Computer Interaction with Mobile Devices and Services
- UIST - ACM Symposium on User Interface Software and Technology
- UMAP - ACM International Conference on User Modeling, Adaptation, and Personalization

== Bioinformatics and computational biology ==
Conferences on bioinformatics and computational biology:

- CIBB - International Conference on Computational Intelligence Methods for Bioinformatics and Biostatistics
- ISMB - Intelligent Systems for Molecular Biology
- PSB - Pacific Symposium on Biocomputing
- RECOMB - Research in Computational Molecular Biology

== See also ==
- ACM SIGHPC – Association for Computing Machinery's Special Interest Group on High Performance Computing
- List of computer science conference acronyms
- List of computer science journals
- Outline of computer science
