= Intel Hardware Security Academic Award =

Intel award for academic hardware security research

- Logo of Intel, which presents the award
- Description: Recently published academic research in hardware security
- Country: United States
- Presented by: Intel
- Rewards: US$75,000 (first prize) and US$50,000 (second prize) in 2021–2022, paid to the winners' institution
- First award: 2021
- Website: intel.com

The Intel Hardware Security Academic Award is an award presented by Intel for recently published academic papers in hardware security. Intel launched the program in 2021 to recognize advances in solutions, tools and methodologies that improve the industry's ability to deliver secure and trustworthy foundational technologies. The award has two categories: a main award for papers published in the preceding one or two years and, since 2022, a Test of Time Award for papers published at least ten years earlier that have had a lasting impact on the field.

== Eligibility and prizes ==
Candidate papers are collected through an open call, and each call covers a fixed publication window. The 2021 call accepted papers published in 2020, with a submission deadline of 3 April 2021. The 2022 call accepted papers first published or presented in calendar year 2021, with a submission deadline of 5 June 2022. The 2024 call covered papers published between 1 January 2022 and 31 December 2023 and was limited to submissions by full-time faculty members. Intel employees cannot be the primary author of a submitted paper; papers with an Intel co-author are eligible, but the Intel co-author does not share in the award. The 2026 call also spanned two years, accepting papers published between 1 January 2024 and 31 December 2025, with a deadline of 15 June 2026; Test of Time submissions had to be published before 1 January 2016. The call stated that finalists would be notified by mid-August 2026 and that the winners would be announced at an Intel academic security event in the fall of 2026.

Submissions are judged on viability, novelty, originality and relevance, with a focus on papers that make a contribution to the hardware security ecosystem.

In the first two editions the first prize was US$75,000 and the second prize US$50,000. The money is paid to the winners' academic institution, to be used for further research or curriculum development, rather than to the authors. The 2022 call also offered twelve months of access to Intel's virtual pre-production environment, a feature on Intel's security podcast and invitations to present at Intel security conferences. The 2024 call does not mention prize money; it lists an announcement on the Intel Newsroom, a podcast feature and an invitation to a special event with senior Intel leaders. The 2026 call likewise mentions no prize money; it lists an invitation to a special event with a senior Intel leader, a feature on Intel's Chips and Salsa security podcast and opportunities to present to Intel's security research teams.

== History ==
The winners of the first edition were announced on 28 May 2021. Isaura Gaeta, Intel's vice president of security research, presented the awards during the IEEE Symposium on Security and Privacy. A committee at Intel selected the first and second prize winners from 26 papers by more than 80 authors in 14 countries.

The results of the second edition were announced on 10 August 2022. That year 34 papers by more than 140 authors from academia and industry in 11 countries competed, and the awards were presented at a reception in Boston held alongside the USENIX Security Symposium by Anand Rajan, senior director of the Emerging Security Lab at Intel Labs. The first Test of Time Award was also given that year. The first prize, awarded to a team led by Wolfgang Kunz at TU Kaiserslautern for a formal method that checks the confidentiality of a chip design during the design phase, was covered by the German trade press; the judges described the approach as the first of its kind, with great potential for practical use.

The 2024 edition covered papers published in 2022 and 2023. Out of 60 nominations from 240 authors at 100 institutions in 17 countries, three papers were recognized: one winner and two honorable mentions. The awards were presented at an event during the 2024 USENIX Security Symposium.

The 2026 edition covered papers published in 2024 and 2025. The selection committee named five finalist papers; one received the Recent Publication Award and two received honorable mentions, and a Test of Time Award was also given. The winners were announced on 30 September 2026 on stage at the Intel Academic Security Conference, an invitation-only event. The other two finalists were BadRAM, presented at the 2025 IEEE Symposium on Security and Privacy, and TLBlur, presented at the 2025 USENIX Security Symposium.

Calls and submissions by edition
Edition	Publication window	Deadline	Papers	Authors	Institutions	Countries	Recognized papers (main award)	Test of Time Award
2026	2024–2025	15 June 2026	–	–	–	–	3	1
2024	2022–2023	10 March 2024	60	240	100	17	3	1
2022	2021	5 June 2022	34	140+	–	11	2	1
2021	2020	3 April 2021	26	80+	–	14	2	–

A dash means that the figure was not given in the announcements for that edition, that the category did not yet exist, or that results have not yet been announced. Publication windows and deadlines are taken from each edition's call. Sources for the figures: Intel's 2021 announcement, Intel's 2022 press release, Purdue University's 2024 news release, and Intel's 2026 announcement.

== Recipients ==
Paper titles link to the published version of each paper.

Year	Category	Paper	Authors	Institutions	Venue
2026	Recent Publication Award	"Chronus: Understanding and Securing the Cutting-Edge Industry Solutions to DRAM Read Disturbance"	Oğuzhan Canpolat, A. Giray Yağlıkçı, Geraldo F. Oliveira, Ataberk Olgun, Nisa Bostancı, İsmail Emir Yüksel, Haocong Luo, Oğuz Ergin, Onur Mutlu	ETH Zurich, TOBB University of Economics and Technology, University of Sharjah	HPCA 2025
2026	Honorable mention	"Segue & ColorGuard: Optimizing SFI Performance and Scalability on Modern Architectures"	Shravan Narayan, Tal Garfinkel, Evan Johnson, Zachary Yedidia, Yingchen Wang, Andrew Brown, Anjo Vahldiek-Oberwagner, Michael LeMay, Wenyong Huang, Xin Wang, Mingqiu Sun, Dean Tullsen, Deian Stefan	University of Texas at Austin, University of California, San Diego and others	ASPLOS 2025
2026	Honorable mention	"Synthesis of Sound and Precise Leakage Contracts for Open-Source RISC-V Processors"	Zilong Wang, Gideon Mohr, Klaus von Gleissenthall, Jan Reineke, Marco Guarnieri	Vrije Universiteit Amsterdam and others	ACM CCS 2025
2026	Test of Time	"Flipping Bits in Memory Without Accessing Them: An Experimental Study of DRAM Disturbance Errors"	Yoongu Kim, Ross Daly, Jeremie Kim, Chris Fallin, Ji Hye Lee, Donghyuk Lee, Chris Wilkerson, Konrad Lai, Onur Mutlu	Carnegie Mellon University, Intel Labs	ISCA 2014
2024	Winner	"There's Always a Bigger Fish: A Clarifying Analysis of a Machine-Learning-Assisted Side-Channel Attack"	Jack Cook, Jules Drean, Jonathan Behrens, Mengjia Yan	Massachusetts Institute of Technology	ISCA 2022
2024	Honorable mention	"Branch History Injection: On the Effectiveness of Hardware Mitigations Against Cross-Privilege Spectre-v2 Attacks"	Enrico Barberis, Pietro Frigo, Marius Muench, Herbert Bos, Cristiano Giuffrida	Vrije Universiteit Amsterdam	USENIX Security Symposium 2022
2024	Honorable mention	"Going beyond the Limits of SFI: Flexible and Secure Hardware-Assisted In-Process Isolation with HFI"	Shravan Narayan, Tal Garfinkel, Mohammadkazem Taram, Joey Rudek, Daniel Moghimi, Evan Johnson, Chris Fallin, Anjo Vahldiek-Oberwagner, Michael LeMay, Ravi Sahita, Dean Tullsen, Deian Stefan	University of California, San Diego, University of Texas at Austin, Purdue University and others	ASPLOS 2023
2024	Test of Time	"Flicker: An Execution Infrastructure for TCB Minimization"	Jonathan M. McCune, Bryan Parno, Adrian Perrig, Michael Reiter, Hiroshi Isozaki	Carnegie Mellon University	EuroSys 2008
2022	First prize	"A Formal Approach to Confidentiality Verification in SoCs at the Register Transfer Level"	Johannes Müller, Mohammad R. Fadiheh, Anna Lena Duque Antón, Thomas Eisenbarth, Dominik Stoffel, Wolfgang Kunz	TU Kaiserslautern, University of Lübeck	Design Automation Conference 2021
2022	Second prize	"Nyx: Greybox Hypervisor Fuzzing using Fast Snapshots and Affine Types"	Sergej Schumilo, Cornelius Aschermann, Thorsten Holz	Ruhr University Bochum, CISPA Helmholtz Center for Information Security	USENIX Security Symposium 2021
2022	Test of Time	"AEGIS: Architecture for Tamper-Evident and Tamper-Resistant Processing"	G. Edward Suh, Dwaine Clarke, Blaise Gassend, Marten van Dijk, Srinivas Devadas	Massachusetts Institute of Technology	International Conference on Supercomputing 2003
2021	First prize	"Speculative Data-Oblivious Execution: Mobilizing Safe Prediction for Safe and Efficient Speculative Execution"	Jiyong Yu, Namrata Mantri, Josep Torrellas, Adam Morrison, Christopher W. Fletcher	University of Illinois Urbana-Champaign, Tel Aviv University	ISCA 2020
2021	Second prize	"Transys: Leveraging Common Security Properties Across Hardware Designs"	Rui Zhang, Cynthia Sturton	University of North Carolina at Chapel Hill	IEEE Symposium on Security and Privacy 2020

Top recognition in the main award
Test of Time Award

== See also ==
- List of computer science awards
