= SAGE-AU =

Australian non-profit association of system administrators

The SAGE-AU logo.

SAGE-AU was an Australian non-profit professional association of system administrators. SAGE-AU was originally formed to provide the same services for Australian system administrators as the SAGE organisation did in the United States, but was completely independent of that entity since SAGE-AU's formation in 1993. SAGE-AU was incorporated in the state of Victoria.

SAGE-AU's mission was to provide services to system administrators to assist in their day-to-day work. In October 2016, SAGE-AU was formally wound up and its assets were transferred to ITPA (Information Technology Professionals Association).

Official deregistration was confirmed in writing by the Victorian Government Department of Justice and Regulation on 22 May 2018.

== Major activities ==
- Hosted several annual events, including The Australian System Administrator's Conference.
- Monthly meetings in New South Wales, Queensland, Victoria, Tasmania, South Australia, and Western Australia.
- Quarterly journals.

== National conference ==
The SAGE-AU national conference, otherwise known as The Australian System Administrator's Conference, was held annually for 18 years, from 1993 until 2011.

- 2011 – 19 to 23 September, Hilton on the Park, Melbourne, Victoria
- 2010 - 9 to 13 August, Wrest Point Hotel Casino, Hobart, Tasmania
- 2009 – 10 to 14 August, The Courtyard Marriott, Surfers Paradise, Queensland
- 2008 – 11 to 15 August, Holiday Inn, Adelaide, South Australia
- 2007 – 23 to 27 July, Carlton Crest Parramatta Hotel, Sydney, New South Wales
- 2006 – 24 to 28 July, Chifley on Northbourne. Canberra, Australian Capital Territory
- 2005 - 5 to 9 September, Rendezvous Observation Hotel. Perth, Western Australia
- 2004 – 16 to 20 August, The Bardon Centre. Brisbane, Queensland
- 2003 – 14 to 18 August, Hobart Grand Chancellor. Hobart, Tasmania
- 2002 - 5 to 9 August, Novotel on Collins. Melbourne, Victoria
- 2001 - 9 to 13 July, Grosvenor Vista Hotel. Adelaide, South Australia
- 2000 - 3 to 7 July, Bond University Conference Centre. Gold Coast, Queensland
- 1999 - 5 to 9 July, Novotel Brighton Beach. Sydney, New South Wales
- 1998 - 6 to 10 July, Old Parliament House. Canberra, Australian Capital Territory
- 1997 – 14 to 18 July, Melbourne Zoo. Melbourne, Victoria
- 1996 – 16 to 19 July, The University of Queensland. Brisbane, Queensland
- 1995 – 12 to 14 July, The University of Wollongong. Wollongong, New South Wales
- 1994 – 11 to 13 July, The University of Western Australia. Perth, Western Australia
- 1993 - 7 to 9 July, The University of Melbourne. Melbourne, Victoria

== Regional conferences ==
Starting in 1999, a number of local SAGE-AU chapters ran one-day "mini conferences".

- 2007 - Tasmanian IT Summer Conference. Held in Hobart on 19 February 2007
- 2007 - SAGE-VIC IT Symposium. Held in Melbourne on 16 February 2007
- 2006 - SAGE-VIC IT Symposium. Held in Melbourne on 28 April 2006
- 2006 - Tasmanian IT Summer Conference. Held in Hobart on 20 February 2006
- 2005 - SAGE-VIC IT Symposium. Held in Melbourne on 11 March 2005
- 2004 - SAGE-VIC IT Symposium. Held in Melbourne on 12 March 2004
- 2004 - Tasmanian IT Summer Conference. Held in Hobart on 23 February 2004
- 2003 - Tasmanian IT Summer Conference. Held in Hobart on 24 February 2003
- 2002 - Tasmanian IT Summer Conference (in conjunction with AUUG). Held in Hobart on 20 March 2002
- 2001 - Tasmanian IT Summer Conference (in conjunction with AUUG). Held in Hobart
- 2000 - Tasmanian IT Summer Conference (in conjunction with AUUG). Held in Hobart
- 1999 - Tasmanian IT Summer Conference (in conjunction with AUUG). Held in Hobart

== SAGE-AU presidents ==
The President of SAGE-AU, along with the rest of the National Executive Committee, are elected through a nomination process. Terms come into effect after the end of each Annual General Meeting, with some exceptions, listed below.

- 2 April 1993 to 8 July 1993 - Hal Miller (see note 1)
- 8 July 1993 to 12 July 1994 - Hal Miller
- 12 July 1994 to 13 July 1995 - Glenn Huxtable
- 13 July 1995 to 18 July 1996 - Glenn Huxtable
- 18 July 1996 to 17 July 1997 - Craig Bishop
- 17 July 1997 to 9 July 1998 - Craig Bishop
- 9 July 1998 to 8 July 1999 - Paul Young
- 8 July 1999 to 6 July 2000 - David Conran
- 6 July 2000 to 5 February 2001 - Andrew Van Der Stock (see note 2)
- 5 February 2001 to 12 July 2001 - Andrew Hennell (see note 3)
- 12 July 2001 to 8 August 2002 - Andrew Hennell
- 8 August 2002 to 7 August 2003 Andrew Hennell
- 7 August 2003 to 19 August 2004 - Donna Ashelford
- 19 August 2004 to 8 September 2005 - Phil Kernick
- 8 September 2005 to 27 July 2006 - Phil Kernick
- 27 July 2006 to 26 July 2007 - Phil Kernick
- 26 July 2007 to 3 February 2011 - Donna Ashelford (see note 4)
- 3 February 2011 to 22 September 2011 - Stephen "Max" Gillies (see note 5)
- 22 September 2011 to 19 September 2012 - Stephen "Max" Gillies (see note 6)
- 19 September 2012 to deregistration - Robert Hudson (see note 7)

1. Was named Interim President at a Special General Meeting on 2 April 1993.
2. Resigned.
3. Was named President by a vote of the standing National Executive Committee at that time.
4. Resigned.
5. Was named President by a vote of the standing National Executive Committee at that time.
6. Resigned
7. Was named President by a vote of the standing National Executive Committee at that time, re-elected unopposed as President at the October 2012 AGM.

== Similar organisations ==
SAGE-AU was wound up in 2016, and replaced by ITPA.

These are some of the similar organisations in other countries. See also System administrator for others.

- League of Professional System Administrators
- SAGE (USA)
- SAGE-WISE (Wales, Ireland, Scotland, England)
- System Administrators Guild of Ireland

== See also ==
- Australian Computer Society
- AUUG
