= Michael R. Lyu =

Hong Kong software engineer

- Born: Taiwan
- Occupation: Professor
- Known for: N-Version Programming
- Website: http://www.cse.cuhk.edu.hk/~lyu

Michael R. Lyu is the Choh-Ming Li Professor of Computer Science and Engineering at the Chinese University of Hong Kong in Shatin, Hong Kong. Lyu is the editor of two book volumes in software reliability engineering: Software Fault Tolerance and the Handbook of Software Reliability Engineering. Both books have been translated into Chinese and published in China. He was named in The AI 2000 Most Influential Scholars Annual List with three appearances.

== Education ==
- B.S. in Electrical Engineering from National Taiwan University (1981).
- M.S. in Computer Science from the University of California, Santa Barbara (1985).
- Ph.D. in Computer Science from the University of California, Los Angeles (1988).

== Professional contributions ==
Lyu's research encompasses software engineering, dependable computing, distributed systems, cloud computing, mobile networking, big data, and machine learning. He has participated in over 30 industrial projects, contributing to the development of numerous commercial systems and software tools. He has published over 700 refereed journal and conference papers.

- Technical Staff Member at Jet Propulsion Laboratory (1988–1990).
- Assistant Professor in the Electrical and Computer Engineering Department at the University of Iowa (1990–1992).
- Member of Technical Staff in the Applied Research Area of Bell Communications Research, Bellcore (1992–1995).
- Research Member of Technical Staff at Bell Laboratories, part of AT&T and later Lucent Technologies (1995–1997).
- Joined CUHK in 1997, serving as Associate Professor (1997–2001) and Professor (2002–present).

Lyu initiated the first International Symposium on Software Reliability Engineering (ISSRE) in 1990 and has been program chair for ISSRE'96, program co-chair for WWW'10, general chair for ISSRE'01, and general co-chair for PRDC'05. He has been on the editorial boards of several journals, including IEEE Transactions on Reliability, IEEE Transactions on Knowledge and Data Engineering, IEEE Transactions on Services Computing, and ACM Transactions on Software Engineering Methodology (TOSEM). Lyu is also on the Steering Committees of the International Workshop on Cloud Intelligence / AIOps (AIOps'25) co-located with ICSE'25 and was also for '23, ASPLOS '24, and MLSys'22.

== Awards and honors ==
- IEEE Fellow (2004)
- AAAS Fellow (2007)
- Croucher Senior Research Fellow (2008)
- IEEE Reliability Society Engineer of the Year (2010)
- ACM Fellow (2015)
- China Computer Federation Overseas Outstanding Contributions Award (2018)
- The 13th Guanghua Engineering Science and Technology Award (2020)
- Fellow of the Hong Kong Academy of Engineering Sciences (2021)

== Books ==
- Software Fault Tolerance (Wiley, 1995)
- Handbook of Software Reliability Engineering (IEEE and McGraw-Hill, 1996)
- Machine Learning: Modeling Data Locally and Globally (Springer, 2008)
- More Than Semi-supervised Learning (LAP LAMBERT Academic Publishing, 2010)
- Sparse Learning Under Regularization Framework (LAP LAMBERT Academic Publishing, 2011)
- QoS Management of Web Services (Springer, 2013)
- QoS Prediction in Cloud and Service Computing (Springer, 2017)

== Selected paper awards ==
- Highlights from 30 years of ISSRE (2019) A Coverage Analysis Tool for the Effectiveness of Software Testing (ISSRE'93)
- Highlights from 30 years of ISSRE (2019) A Novel Method for Early Software Quality Prediction Based on Support Vector Machine (ISSRE'05)
- CIKM Test of Time Award (2019) SoRec: Social Recommendation Using Probabilistic Matrix Factorization (CIKM'08)
- SIGIR Test of Time Award (2020) Learning to Recommend with Social Trust Ensemble (SIGIR'09)
- ACM SIGSOFT Distinguished Paper Award (2010) Collaborative Reliability Prediction for Service-Oriented Systems (ICSE'10)
- WSDM Test of Time Award (2022) Recommender systems with social regularization (WSDM'11)
- Vannevar Bush Best Paper Award (2012)] Modeling and Exploiting Heterogeneous Bibliographic Networks for Expertise Ranking (JCDL'12)
- Highlights from 30 years of ISSRE (2019) Experience Report: System Log Analysis for Anomaly Detection (ISSRE'16)
- ACM SIGSOFT Distinguished Paper Award (2023)] Generative Type Inference for Python (ASE'23)
- ICLR 2024 Oral (86/7404, 1.16%)] On the Humanity of Conversational AI: Evaluating the Psychological Portrayal of LLMs (ICLR'24)
