= FCT =

FCT may refer to:

== Mathematics ==
- Flux-corrected transport
- Fast cosine transform
- International Symposium on Fundamentals of Computation Theory

== Places ==
- Australian Capital Territory, formerly the Federal Capital Territory
- Claremont railway station, Perth, in Western Australia
- Federal Capital Territory (Nigeria)
- Federal Capital Territory (Pakistan), around Karachi, now defunct
- Fort Canning Tunnel, in Singapore

== Sport ==
- FC Trollhättan, a Swedish football club
- FC Twente, a Dutch football club

== Other uses ==
- 2001 Sino-Russian Treaty of Friendship
- Faculdade de Ciências e Tecnologia (disambiguation)
- Fellow of the Association of Corporate Treasurers, a professional organisation
- Flight Control Team, in space flights
- Florida Communities Trust
- Fundação para a Ciência e Tecnologia, the main funding agency for scientific research in Portugal
- Functional testing
- Fukushima Central Television, a Japanese television company
