= ACM SIGOPS Annual Technical Conference =

Conference of computing professions

- Abbreviation: ATC
- Discipline: Systems research

Publication details
- Publisher: ACM
- History: 1975–now
- Frequency: Biannual (1975–1994); Annual (1995–now)

The ACM SIGOPS Annual Technical Conference (formerly the USENIX Annual Technical Conference), or ATC for short, is an academic conference focused on systems research. It is sponsored by ACM SIGOPS, the Special Interest Group on Operating Systems. Between 1975 and 2025, ATC was sponsored by USENIX and constituted its flagship conference; for much of this period, it was referred to simply as "USENIX." After 50 years of activity, USENIX decided to sunset ATC, but SIGOPS stepped in to continue the conference in response to a community petition.

== History ==
The first official USENIX conference was organized by Mel Ferentz at CUNY in June 1975; it had approximately 40 attendees from 20 institutions. The conference evolved into a twice-yearly event, with one conference in summer and one in winter, and eventually grew to over 3,000 attendees. It had a strong practical bias and emphasized implementation; it included computing tutorials, a single-track technical session for presenting refereed research papers, Special Interest Group meetings, and BoFs. In 1995, the conference was changed to a single annual conference; hence the name.

Around 2000, the focus of the conference shifted toward academic research. It came to be seen as a prestigious venue for systems research and received an 'A' rating from the CORE Conference Ranking system. This shift in focus was accompanied by a substantial decline in practitioner attendance. In parallel, a number of more specialized USENIX conferences emerged, such as OSDI, NSDI, FAST, and USENIX Security, some of which came to be regarded as more prestigious than ATC. Together, these developments contributed to ATC's declining attendance, from about 1,700 attendees in 2000 to about 300 in 2019. Although significantly smaller, attendance at that scale is generally considered reasonable and comparable to that of other academic systems research conferences, such as EuroSys.

In 2020, ATC was held virtually due to the COVID-19 pandemic. Since 2021, USENIX has co-located ATC with OSDI. Although attendees could freely move between the technical sessions of the two conferences and thus effectively attend both, USENIX required registrants to choose either ATC or OSDI on the online registration form. This either-or policy reduced the number of ATC registrants—not necessarily attendees—to 165 in 2024. The registration form also asked registrants whether they planned to attend both conferences, but USENIX did not publicize those numbers, so the actual number of attendees remains unknown.

In 2025, USENIX declared the end of the conference series after 50 years of activity. Subsequently, members of the systems research community petitioned ACM SIGOPS to step in and sponsor ATC instead; the petition was signed by a majority of the USENIX ATC steering committee members, along with hundreds of others, many of whom had authored ATC papers or served on ATC program committees. The rationale cited in support of continuing the conference included the rapidly growing number of ATC paper submissions (more than 350 in 2023, nearly 490 in 2024, and over 630 in 2025) and the fact that ACM conferences are organized by unpaid volunteer committees, making attendance less of a concern than at USENIX conferences, which are administered by paid staff.

SIGOPS and USENIX officers deliberated through mid and late 2025 before formally agreeing to the transition, following two earlier precedents: USENIX HotOS and USENIX HotStorage, both of which continue under SIGOPS after being deemed unsuitable for the USENIX business model. ATC retained its acronym while changing its full name from "USENIX Annual Technical Conference" to "ACM SIGOPS Annual Technical Conference." The ATC steering committee (SC) was reconstituted under SIGOPS: the 14 program co-chairs of the last seven ATC instances were invited to serve, 12 of whom agreed, along with the current and former SIGOPS chairs, who replaced the USENIX officers on the former SC. The reconstituted SC decided to retain the 2026 program co-chairs who had been appointed by its predecessor shortly before USENIX decided to end ATC.

While sponsored by USENIX, ATC was always held in the United States. With SIGOPS's sponsorship, ATC rotates among Asia, Europe, and North America on a three-year cycle. Accordingly, ATC 2026 has been scheduled to take place in Hong Kong, and ATC 2027 in France. Because the transition from USENIX to SIGOPS took time, ATC 2026 was scheduled with a June submission deadline and a November conference date. This is an exception: beginning with ATC 2027, the conference resumes its original submission deadline of January and its original conference date of July.

== Impact ==
Several notable announcements took place at ATC: in 1979, ONYX, the first attempt at genuine UNIX hardware, was revealed; in 1980, Jim Ellis announced Usenet; and in 1982, DEC unveiled the creation of its UNIX product. Additionally, a number of well-known UNIX systems were first presented as ATC papers, including Sendmail, NFS, Kerberos, the X Window system, Perl, Tcl, and GNOME. In 1995, James Gosling announced "Oak", which eventually became the Java Programming Language.
