= Symposium on Networked Systems Design and Implementation =

Conference on distributed systems and networking

- Abbreviation: NSDI
- Discipline: Research on Distributed systems and Networking

Publication details
- Publisher: USENIX
- History: 2004-
- Frequency: annual

The Symposium on Networked Systems Design and Implementation (NSDI) is an academic conference that focuses on the design principles of large-scale distributed and networked systems.

== History ==
NSDI was started in 2004, with Robert Morris and Stefan Savage as the first program chairs. At the time, research on distributed systems and networking was occurring in two independent and rather disjoint communities, the former publishing its work at SOSP and OSDI and the latter publishing primarily at SIGCOMM. The conference was meant to bring these two communities together. It was organized by USENIX, in close cooperationg with both ACM SIGOPS and ACM SIGCOMM.

Over the years, NSDI has grown considerably, from 120 submissions in 2004 to 666 in 2025. It was single-track until 2021; since then, presentations have been organized into two parallel tracks. The conference is highly selective and has typically accepted between 12% and 20% of its submissions.

== See also ==
- List of computer science conferences
