= SCIA =

SCIA may refer to:

- Scandinavian Conference on Image Analysis
- Spinal Cord Injuries Australia
- Software change impact analysis
- United States Senate Committee on Indian Affairs
- The Sky Crawlers: Innocent Aces, an air combat video game
- Shenzhen Court of International Arbitration
- Setor Complementar de Indústria e Abastecimento, an administrative region of the Federal District in Brazil
- Simultaneous converging instrument approach, a form of instrument approach in aviation
