= ISGC =

ISGC may refer to:

- International Shakespeare's Globe Centre in London, England; a group of buildings and facilities, the centerpiece of which is "Shakespeare's Globe".
- International Symposium on Grid Computing, also known as the International Symposium on Grids and Clouds; held annually in Taipei, Taiwan. see also: List of computer science conferences
- Information Systems Group, Inc., a small U.S. IT company, which operates their corporate website at the domain name "isgc.com".
- Illinois Space Grant Consortium, the component of Nasa's National Space Grant College and Fellowship Program based in the State of Illinois.
- the Thermaltake ISGC Fan series; a brand of cooling fans for computers, produced by Thermaltake Technology Co., Ltd.
- International Stargate Command, a location in the Stargate fictional universe.
- International Steel Guitar Convention.
- International Society of Gastroenterological Carcinogenesis
- International Society of Guatemala Collectors; a postage stamp collecting group focussed on Guatemalan stamps.
- Islamic Society of Greater Chattanooga; a mosque in Chattanooga, Tennessee.
- Image Shape Ground Canvas .isgc filetype.
