= Michael Reiter (computer scientist) =

American computer scientist

- Education: North Carolina; Cornell
- Awards: Fellow of the Association for Computing Machinery
- Scientific career
- Fields: Computer scientist
- Workplaces: North Carolina; Carnegie Mellon; Bell Labs

Michael K. Reiter is a fellow of the Association for Computing Machinery and a James B. Duke Professor at Duke University. He was formerly the Lawrence M. Slifkin Distinguished Professor of Computer Science at the University of North Carolina at Chapel Hill. He was previously a professor of electrical and computer engineering and computer science at Carnegie Mellon University in Pittsburgh. Reiter's research interests are in computer and communications security and distributed computing.

In 2024, "Flicker: An Execution Infrastructure for TCB Minimization", a 2008 EuroSys paper he co-authored with Jonathan McCune, Bryan Parno, Adrian Perrig and Hiroshi Isozaki, received the Test of Time Award of the Intel Hardware Security Academic Award.
