= BMVC =

BMVC may refer to:

- Bishop Moore Vidyapith, Cherthala, a school in Kerala, India
- British Machine Vision Conference, a computer science conference
- Blaenavon Male Voice Choir a male voice choir
