= HPCA =

HPCA may refer to:

- High Performance Computing Act of 1991, a U.S. act of Congress
- Himachal Pradesh Cricket Association, a sports body in India
- HPCA (gene), which encodes the protein hippocalcin
- International Symposium on High-Performance Computer Architecture, an annual IEEE conference on computer architecture
