= Sun Certified Network Administrator =

Certification for system administrators

SCNA (an abbreviation of Sun Certified Network Administrator) is a certification for system administrators and covers LANs and Solaris.

== Requirements ==
Candidates must pass a certification exam. The examination includes multiple-choice, scenario-based questions, drag-and-drop questions, and tests the candidate on Solaris network administration topics including how to configure and manage the network interface layer, the network (internet and transport layers), network applications, and the Solaris IP Filter.

Candidates must have three or more years of experience administering Sun systems in a networked environment.

Certification also requires already being a Sun Certified System Administrator for Solaris (any edition).
