= League of Professional System Administrators =

American professional association

League of Professional System Administrators (LOPSA)
- Founded: 2004
- Defunct: 2025
- Type: Professional association
- Purpose: To advance the practice of system administration; to support, recognize, educate, and encourage its practitioners; and to serve the public through education and outreach on system administration issues
- Location: Mount Laurel, New Jersey United States
- Origins: USENIX
- Method: Education, Outreach
- Website: www.lopsa.org

The League of Professional System Administrators (LOPSA), founded in 2004, was a professional association for IT Administrators.

== History and formation ==
Originally, the corporation was created as "The System Administrators Guild, Inc" in July 2004 by volunteers of the USENIX Association as part of a plan to spin off its SAGE Special Technical Group into a separate organization. After the spin-off from the USENIX Association was halted in November 2005, the volunteers involved in the spin-off opted to move forward as a new organization which was renamed LOPSA, and began reorganizing itself into an independent entity.

On June 13th of 2025, it was announced that LOPSA would be dissolved as an organization.

On December 26th, 2025, LOPSA was officially dissolved.

== Scope and operations ==
The organization's mission was "to advance the practice of system administration; to support, recognize, educate, and encourage its practitioners; and to serve the public through education and outreach on system administration issues".

LOPSA had several ongoing programs that it uses to further its mission.

=== Mentorship ===
The LOPSA mentorship program was conceived in 2010 as a way to network inexperienced system administrators with senior members of the organization who could help them on project-related topics. As of January 2013, the mentorship program accepts ongoing, rather than project-based, projects. Protege status was open to any system administrator irrespective of membership in LOPSA, while mentor status requires an active membership in the organization.

=== WiAC Scholarship ===
There was a well-recognized disparity between men and women in STEM fields. LOPSA provides an annual stipend for one woman to attend the USENIX Women in Advanced Computing (WiAC) Summit. The recipient was chosen through an essay contest.

=== Regional conferences ===
LOPSA had formed multiple local chapters in cities in throughout the United States. Two LOPSA chapters have formed regionally-targeted system administration conferences.

- Cascadia IT Conference in Seattle, Washington

=== Training and tutorials ===
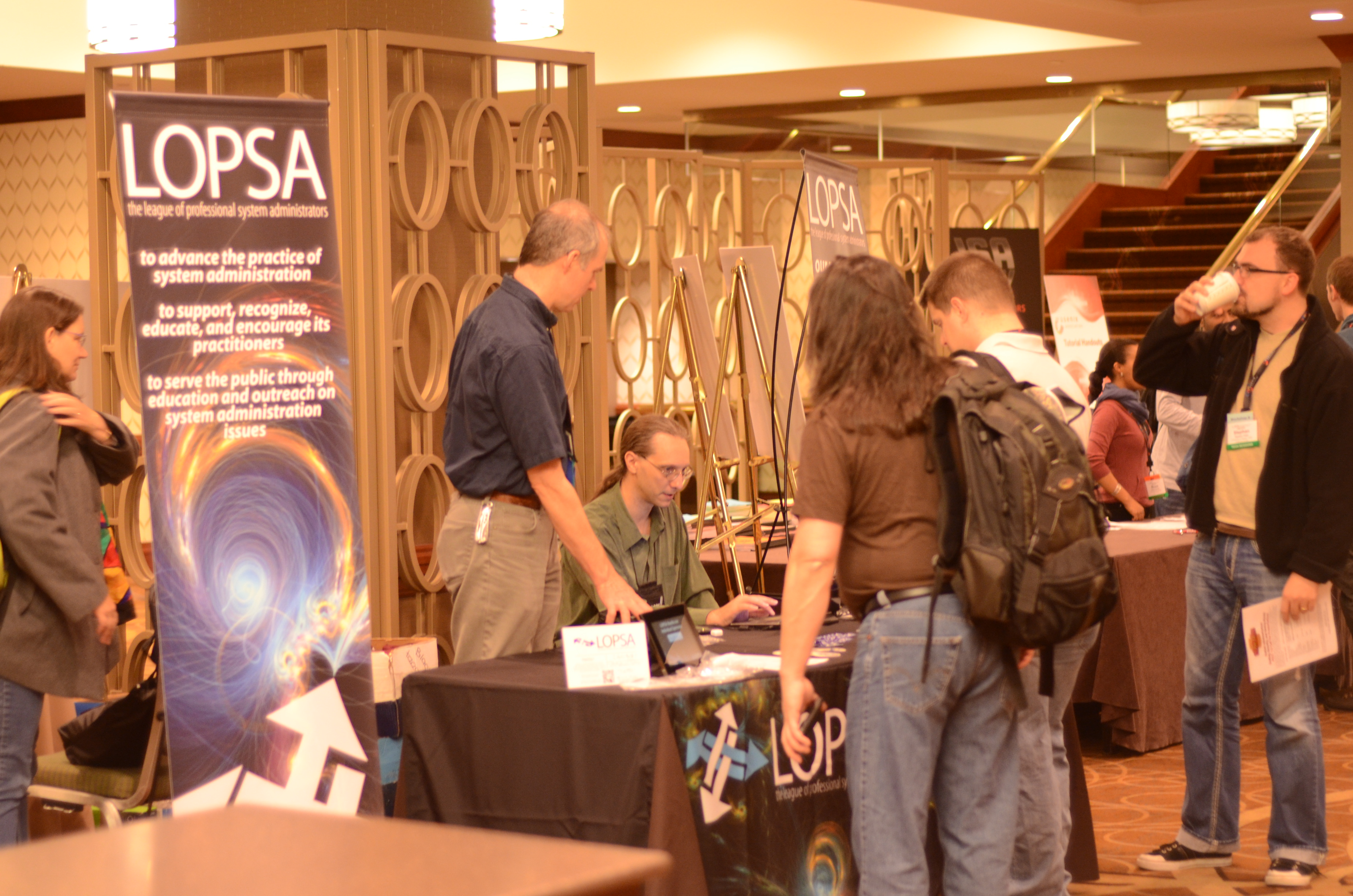
System Administrators gather at an information booth for LOPSA at a conference.

== Organizational structure ==
The organization was a 501c3 not-for-profit group, and was governed by a nine-member board of directors. The first board was elected in July 2005 by the membership of SAGE. Elections are held each year for either four or five board members, with each election term being for two years.

LOPSA was headquartered in Mount Laurel, New Jersey.

== Chapters and affiliations ==
LOPSA fosters community through local chapters and affiliation with and support for other local groups.

=== Chapters in the Americas ===
- Seattle, Washington - Seattle Area Systems Administrators Guild
- Eastern Tennessee - ETENN
- Columbus, Ohio - LOPSA-US-OH-Columbus
- Los Angeles, California - LOPSA-LA
- San Diego, California - LOPSA-SD
- Ottawa - Ottawa Valley System Administrators Guild

=== Established affiliates ===
- Los Angeles, California - UNIX Users Association of southern California - LA Chapter

=== Other regional system administration groups ===
- Americas
  - San Francisco Bay Area - BayLISA
- Australia
  - Information Technology Professionals Association (ITPA)
