= LISA (organization) =

USENIX special interest group for system administrators

LISA-SIG
- Website: www.usenix.org/lisa

LISA-SIG is the USENIX special interest group for system administrators. LISA-SIG was known officially as the System Administrators Guild until November 2003; from 2003 to 2010, it was known as SAGE.

In March 2016 it was announced that LISA-SIG was being retired.

== Major activities ==
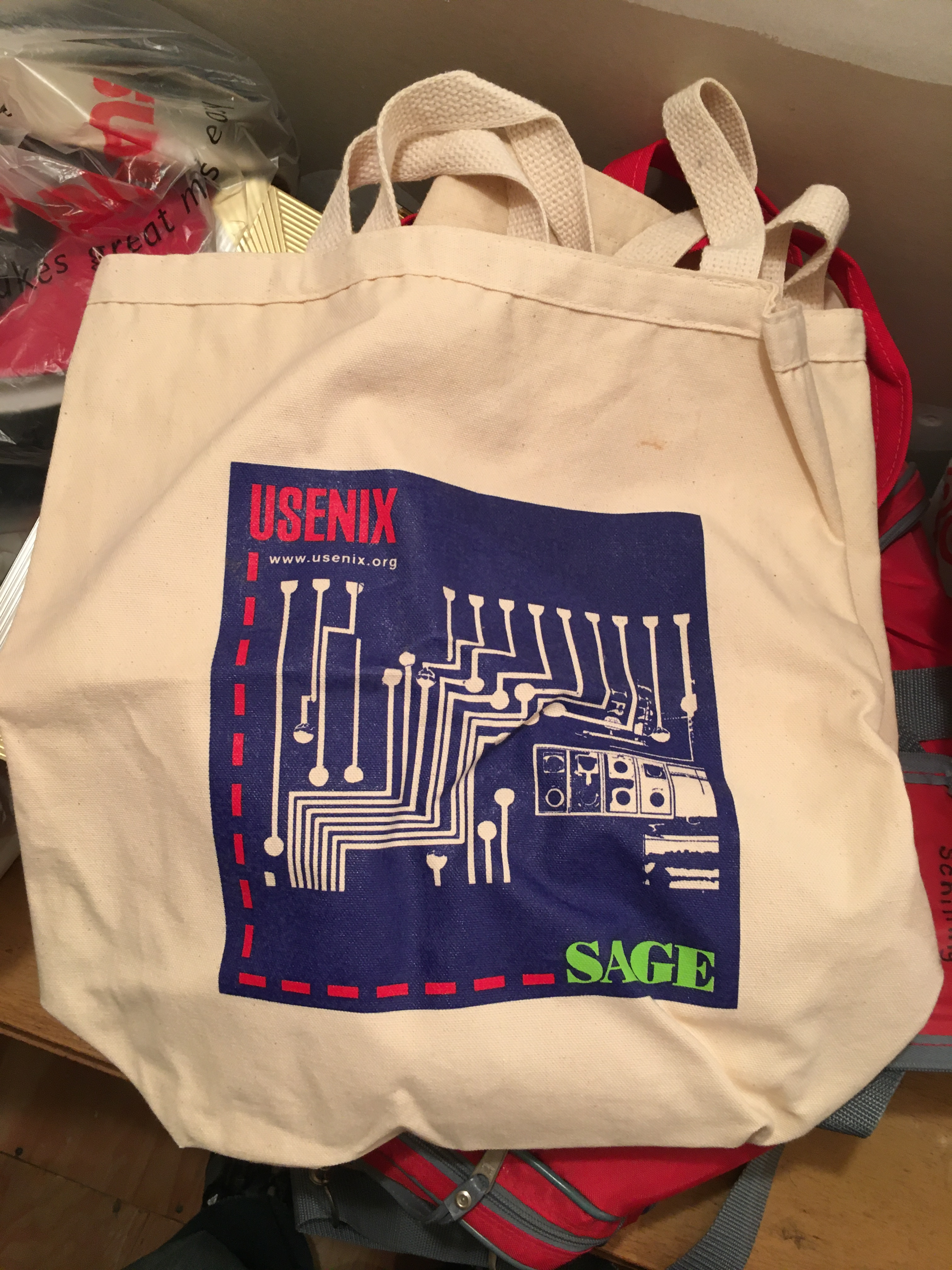
USENIX/SAGE tote bag

- Co-sponsors the annual system administration conference, also known as LISA.
- Hosts several technical and professional mailing lists.
- Provides a job listing service.
- Compiles an annual salary survey of system administrators' salaries keyed to many variables.
- Publishes a series of short topics booklets in the field of system administration.
- Establishes and promotes a code of ethics for system administrators.
- Supports local user groups.
- Offers an IRC channel.
- Presents an annual award for outstanding contributions to the field of system administration.

== Proposed spinoff ==
In June 2004, SAGE was dissolved as a Special Technical Group to prepare for a spin-off from its parent organization, USENIX. On October 27, 2005, the USENIX Board, by a 4–4 vote, failed to approve a motion to progress the separation of SAGE from USENIX, declaring instead that SAGE is better as a suborganization. This contributed to the formation of LOPSA by individuals involved in the aborted spinoff.

== See also ==
- League of Professional System Administrators
- SAGE-AU (Australia)
- System Administrators Guild of Ireland
