= ;login: =

Technical journal published by the USENIX Association

;login: is the USENIX Association's magazine. It has been published continuously since 1975. According to the USENIX website, ;login: "provides a forum for USENIX members and others in the advanced computing systems community to share announcements, technical articles, and opinion."

== History ==
The magazine was first published in 1975. It was initially produced for the members of the USENIX Association, which is an organization of engineers, system administrators, scientists, and technicians working on advanced computing systems.

Since 2018, issues from 1983 to 2000 have been made available via the Internet Archive. Issues from 2001 onward are freely available on the USENIX website.
