= Jay Lepreau =

American computer scientist

- Born: March 27, 1952
- Died: September 15, 2008
- Education: University of Utah (1983)
- Known for: Emulab testbed; Fluke microkernel; Flask security architecture; OSKit
- Spouse: Caroline Kueneman
- Children: 4
- Scientific career
- Fields: Computer Science
- Workplaces: University of Utah

Jay Lepreau (March 27, 1952 – September 15, 2008) was an American computer scientist and a research professor at the University of Utah. He is best known as the creator of Emulab, a network emulation testbed and as the creator and first program chair of the OSDI conference.

== Career ==
Jay Lepreau was born on March 27, 1952, to Frank J. Lepreau Jr. and Miriam Barwood. He spent his childhood both in Massachusetts and in Central Haiti, where his father was treating patients at the Hospital Albert Schweitzer. In 1980, he joined the University of Utah as an undergraduate and started working as a programmer. He graduated in 1983 and became the manager of the systems programming group. He helped introduce Utah to UNIX, and by 1987 was the acting head of the Computer Science Department's computing facility, where he and his group worked on systems software such as the GNU compiler tools and the Mach operating system. In 1990, Lepreau became the assistant director of the department's Center for Software Science, where his work shifted from engineering to research. In 1994, he founded the OSDI conference and served as its first program chair; in 1995, he renamed his group as the Flux Operating Systems Project. He was promoted to Research Assistant Professor in 1997, to Research Associate Professor in 2000, and to research professor in 2004.

In the late 1990s, Lepreau's group started developing the network testbed that would eventually become Emulab. It was initially meant for the group's internal use, but was made available to other researchers in 2000. It eventually acquired thousands of users around the world, and supported thousands of experiments every year.

Lepreau died in September 2008 due to complications of cancer. To honor his contributions to computer systems, the University of Utah established a new faculty position, the Jay Lepreau Professorship of Computer Science. Also, the Best Paper award at OSDI is named after him.
