= AUUG =

Australian group

The AUUG logo.

AUUG /ˈɔːɡ/ was an Australian association and users' group. It described itself as the organisation for Unix, Linux and Open Source professionals. Its aim was to build a community of those interested in open systems and open standards. The newsletter AUUGN is pronounced /ˈɔːɡən/.

AUUG ran nationally with chapters in most states and territories. The main activities were a website, mailing lists, the AUUGN newsletter, various conferences, and chapter meetings.

Along with USENIX, AUUG was one of the oldest Unix user groups in the world. Founded in 1975 by John Lions and others as the Australian Unix systems User Group, it later broadened its remit but retained the name. It was constituted on 27 August 1984 and incorporated as "AUUG Inc" on 26 August 1988 in Victoria. AUUG was dissolved between 2010 and January 2015, though it had been in decline for years, and its members were asked to vote on whether to continue as early as 2007. There is an AUUG Preservation Society which took over management of the auug.org.au domain name in June 2011.

As of 9 January 2015, the Victorian Incorporated Association Register lists A0016636N (AUUG Inc) as Deregistered with its last return filed in 1995.

== National conference ==
Some conferences included three days of tutorials before hand.

- 2007 – 12 to 14 October, Melbourne
- 2006 – 10 to 13 October, Rendezvous Hotel in Melbourne
- 2005 – 19 to 21 October, Carlton Crest Hotel in Sydney
- 2004 – 29 to 31 August, Duxton Hotel, Flinders St, Melbourne
- 2002 – 4 to 6 September, Melbourne

== Annual General Meetings ==
- "2008 AGM"., CSC Office in Braddon, ACT
- "2007 AGM"., Melbourne Museum.
- "2006 AGM"., Rendezvous Hotel, 328 Flinders Street, Melbourne, Victoria
- "2005 AGM"., Carlton Crest Hotel in Sydney
- "2004 AGM"., The Duxton Hotel, 328 Flinders Street, Melbourne, Victoria

== Governance ==
Office Bearers
Year Elected/Appointed	President	Vice President	Secretary	Treasurer	Committee	Returning Officer	Assistant Returning Officer
1986	Ken McDonell		Robert Elz	Chris Maltby	Chris Campbell, John Lions, Tim Roper, Lionel Singer	John O'Brien	
1987	Ken McDonell		Robert Elz	Chris Maltby	Chris Campbell, Piers Lauder, John Lions, Tim Roper	John O'Brien	
1988	Greg Rose		Tim Roper	Michael Tuke	Rich Burridge, Frank Crawford, Chris Maltby, Tim Segall	John O'Brien	
1989	Greg Rose		Tim Roper	Michael Tuke	Peter Barnes, John Carey, Pat Duffy, Chris Maltby	John O'Brien	David Purdue
1990	Greg Rose		Peter Barnes	Michael Tuke	Frank Crawford, Pat Duffy, Andrew Gollan, Chris Maltby	John O'Brien	David Purdue
1991	Pat Duffy	Chris Maltby	Rolf Jester	Frank Crawford	Andrew Gollan, Glenn Huxtable, Peter Karr, Scott Merrilees, Michael Tuke	John O'Brien	
1992	Phil McCrea	Glenn Huxtable	Peter Wishart	Frank Crawford	Rolf Jester, Chris Maltby, John O'Brien, Michael Paddon, Greg Rose	Michael Tuke	
1993	Phil McCrea	Glenn Huxtable	Peter Wishart	Frank Crawford	Greg Birnie, Stephen Boucher, Chris Maltby, Michael Paddon, Chris Schoettle	Michael Tuke	
1994	Phil McCrea	Glenn Huxtable	Peter Wishart	Frank Crawford	Stephen Boucher, Lucy Chubb, Chris Maltby, Michael Paddon, Rick Stevenson	David Purdue	
1995	Michael Paddon	Glenn Huxtable	Peter Wishart	Stephen Boucher	Lucy Chubb, Frank Crawford, Chris Maltby, Phil McCrea, David Purdue		
1996	Michael Paddon	Lucy Chubb	David Purdue	Stephen Boucher	Malcolm Caldwell, Alan Cowie, Frank Crawford, Mark White, Pauline van Winsen		Peter Chubb
1997	Michael Paddon	Lucy Chubb	David Purdue	Stephen Boucher	Malcolm Caldwell, Luigi Cantoni, Peter Laytham, Mark White		
1998	Lucy Chubb	David Purdue	Mark White	Stephen Boucher	Malcolm Caldwell, Luigi Cantoni, Günther Feuereisen, Peter Gray, Michael Paddon		
1999	David Purdue	Mark White	Stephen Boucher	Luigi Cantoni	Malcolm Caldwell, Lucy Chubb, Günther Feuereisen, Peter Gray, David Newall, Michael Paddon		
2000	David Purdue	Malcolm Caldwell	Michael Paddon	Luigi Cantoni	Sarah Bolderoff, Alan Cowie, Greg Lehey, Peter Gray, David Newall		
2001	David Purdue	Michael Paddon	Greg Lehey	Luigi Cantoni	Sarah Bolderoff, Malcom Caldwell, Peter Gray, Conrad Parker, Warren Toomey		
2002	Greg Lehey	Malcom Caldwell	David Bullock	Gordon Hubbard	Sarah Bolderoff, Adrian Close, David Purdue, Stephen Rothwell, Andrew Rutherford, Mark White		
2003	Greg Lehey	David Purdue	Adrian Close	Gordon Hubbard	Jonathon Coombes, Andrew Frederick Cowie, Steve Landers, Stephen Rothwell, Michael Still		
2004	David Purdue	Steve Landers	Jonathon Coombes	Gordon Hubbard	Grant Allan, Adrian Close, Andrew Frederick Cowie, Enno Davids, Michael Still	Jason Ozolins	David Baldwin

== Other activities ==
In 2003, AUUG condemned SCO Group in the SCO–Linux disputes.

== Other AUUGs ==
AUUG was not associated with the Atlanta UNIX Users Groups (AUUG).

== See also ==
Related organisations

- Australian Computer Society
- Linux Australia
- Open Source Industry Australia
- SAGE-AU
- Linux User Groups in Australia and Open Source Community Groups
- Other Linux Open Source Groups in Australia and New Zealand
