= International Conference on Dependable Systems and Networks =

Computer networking conference

The International Conference on Dependable Systems and Networks (or DSN) is an annual conference on topics related to dependable computer systems and reliable networks. It typically features a number of coordinated tracks, including the main paper track, several workshops, tutorials, industry session, a student forum, and fast abstracts. It is sponsored by the IEEE and the IFIP WG 10.4 on Dependable Computing and Fault Tolerance. DSN was formed in 2000 by merging the IEEE International Symposium on Fault-Tolerant Computing (FTCS) and the IFIP International Working Conference on Dependable Computing for Critical Applications (DCCA). The instance number for DSN is taken from FTCS which was first held in 1980 and annually thereafter.

A DSN Hall of Fame ranks the researchers by the number of papers that they have published in DSN.

- In 2020, the 50th DSN was to be held in Valencia, Spain and due to the Covid situation, was held virtually.
- In 2021, the 51st DSN was to be held in Taipei, Taiwan and due to the Covid situation, was held virtually.
- In 2022, the 52nd DSN was held in person in Baltimore, Maryland, United States.
- In 2023, the 53rd DSN is scheduled to be held in Porto, Portugal.

== Awards ==
The following awards are given at DSN.

- Best paper award: The winner from among three nominees is selected through audience voting
- William C. Carter PhD Dissertation Award in Dependability
- Rising Star in Dependability Award
- Test-of-Time Award: This recognizes two papers published at DSN 10 years ago
- Jean-Claude Laprie Award: This recognizes outstanding papers that have significantly influenced the theory and/or practice of dependable computing
