= ECML PKDD =

Machine-learning and computational-neuroscience conference

European Conference on Machine Learning and Principles and Practice of Knowledge Discovery in Databases
- Abbreviation: ECML PKDD
- Discipline: Data Mining, Machine learning, statistics, artificial intelligence

Publication details
- History: 2001–present
- Frequency: Annual
- Website: ecmlpkdd.org

ECML PKDD, the European Conference on Machine Learning Principles and Practice of Knowledge Discovery in Databases, is one of the leading academic conferences on machine learning and knowledge discovery, held in Europe every year.

== History ==
ECML PKDD is a merger of two European conferences, European Conference on Machine Learning (ECML) and European Conference on Principles and Practice of Knowledge Discovery in Databases (PKDD). ECML and PKDD have been co-located since 2001; however, both ECML and PKDD retained their own identity until 2007. For example, the 2007 conference was known as "the 18th European Conference on Machine Learning (ECML) and the 11th European Conference on Principles and Practice of Knowledge Discovery in Databases (PKDD)", or in brief, "ECML/PKDD 2007", and both ECML and PKDD had their own conference proceedings. In 2008 the conferences were merged into one conference, and the division into traditional ECML topics and traditional PKDD topics was removed.

The history of ECML dates back to 1986, when the European Working Session on Learning was first held. In 1993 the name of the conference was changed to European Conference on Machine Learning.

PKDD was first organised in 1997. Originally PKDD stood for the European Symposium on Principles of Data Mining and Knowledge Discovery from Databases. The name European Conference on Principles and Practice of Knowledge Discovery in Databases was used since 1999.

The conference remains highly competitive, consistently maintaining an average acceptance rate of around 25% for the main research track.

== Upcoming conferences ==
| Conference | Year | City | Country | Date |
|---|---|---|---|---|
| ECMLPKDD | 2026 | Naples | Italy | September 7–11 |

== List of past conferences ==
| Conference | Year | City | Country | Date |
|---|---|---|---|---|
| ECMLPKDD | 2025 | Porto | Portugal | September 15–19 |
| ECMLPKDD | 2024 | Vilnius | Lithuania | September 9–13 |
| ECMLPKDD | 2023 | Turin | Italy | September 18–22 |
| ECMLPKDD | 2022 | Grenoble | France | September 19–23 |
| ECMLPKDD | 2021 | virtual | | September 13–17 |
| ECMLPKDD | 2020 | virtual | | September 14-18 |
| ECMLPKDD | 2019 | Würzburg | Germany | September 16–20 |
| ECMLPKDD | 2018 | Dublin | Ireland | September 10–14 |
| ECMLPKDD | 2017 | Skopje | Macedonia | September 18–22 |
| ECMLPKDD | 2016 | Riva del Garda | Italy | September 19–23 |
| ECMLPKDD | 2015 | Porto | Portugal | September 7–11 |
| ECMLPKDD | 2014 | Nancy | France | September 15–19 |
| ECMLPKDD | 2013 | Prague | Czech Republic | September 23–27 |
| ECML PKDD | 2012 | Bristol | (United Kingdom) Great Britain | September 24–28 |
| ECML PKDD | 2011 | Athens | Greece | September 5–9 |
| ECML PKDD | 2010 | Barcelona | Spain | September 20–24 |
| ECML PKDD | 2009 | Bled | Slovenia | September 7–11 |
| ECML PKDD | 2008 | Antwerp | Belgium | September 15–19 |
| 18th ECML/11th PKDD | 2007 | Warsaw | Poland | September 17–21 |
| 17th ECML/10th PKDD | 2006 | Berlin | Germany | September 18–22 |
| 16th ECML/9th PKDD | 2005 | Porto | Portugal | October 3–7 |
| 15th ECML/8th PKDD | 2004 | Pisa | Italy | September 20–24 |
| 14th ECML/7th PKDD | 2003 | Cavtat/Dubrovnik | Croatia | September 22–26 |
| 13th ECML/6th PKDD | 2002 | Helsinki | Finland | August 19–23 |
| 12th ECML/5th PKDD | 2001 | Freiburg | Germany | September 3–7 |
| 11th ECML | 2000 | Barcelona | Spain | May 30–June 2 |
| 10th ECML | 1998 | Chemnitz | Germany | April 21–24 |
| 9th ECML | 1997 | Prague | Czech Republic | April 23–26 |
| 8th ECML | 1995 | Heraklion | Greece | April 25–27 |
| 7th ECML | 1994 | Catania | Italy | April 6–8 |
| 6th ECML | 1993 | Vienna | Austria | April 5–7 |
| 5th EWSL | 1991 | Porto | Portugal | March 6–8 |
| 4th PKDD | 2000 | Lyon | France | September 13–16 |
| 3rd PKDD | 1999 | Prague | Czech Republic | September 15–18 |
| 2nd PKDD | 1998 | Nantes | France | September 23–26 |
| 1st PKDD | 1997 | Trondheim | Norway | June 24–27 |

| Conference | Year | City | Country | Date |
|---|---|---|---|---|
| 4th EWSL | 1989 | Montpellier | France | December 4–6 |
| 3rd EWSL | 1988 | Glasgow | (United Kingdom) Great Britain | October 3–5 |
| 2nd EWSL | 1987 | Bled | Yugoslavia | May 13–15 |
| 1st EWSL | 1986 | Orsay | France | February 3–4 |

== See also ==
- Conference on Neural Information Processing Systems (NeurIPS)
- European Conference on Computational Biology (ECCB)
- International Conference on Computational Intelligence Methods for Bioinformatics and Biostatistics (CIBB)
- International Conference on Machine Learning (ICML)
