= Adrian Perrig =

Swiss computer researcher

Adrian Perrig (born 1972) is a Swiss computer science researcher and professor at ETH Zurich, leading the Network Security research group. His research focuses on networking and systems security, and specifically on the design of a secure next-generation internet architecture.

== Biography ==
Born 1972, Perrig is a Swiss computer science researcher specialising in the areas of security, networking, and applied cryptography. He received his BSc degree in Computer Engineering from EPFL in 1997, MS and PhD degrees from Carnegie Mellon University in 1998 and 2001, respectively. He spent three years during his PhD working with his advisor Doug Tygar at the University of California, Berkeley. From 2002 to 2012, he was a Professor of Electrical and Computer Engineering, Engineering and Public Policy, and Computer Science (courtesy) at Carnegie Mellon University, becoming Full Professor in 2009. From 2007 to 2012, he served as the technical director for Carnegie Mellon's Cybersecurity Laboratory (CyLab). During this time he built a research project called SCI-FI (Secure Communications Infrastructure for a Future Internet). A research project aimed at building a next-generation secure internet architecture. The project later got renamed into SCION (Scalability, Control, and Isolation On Next-generation networks). Since 2013, he is professor at ETH Zurich, leading the Network Security Group, whose research “revolves around building secure and robust network systems—with a particular focus on the design, development, and deployment of the SCION Internet architecture.".

To commercialise the SCION technology, Adrian Perrig in 2017 founded the ETH Zurich spin-off Anapaya Systems together with Samuel Hitz and fellow professors at the Department of Computer Science David Basin and Peter Müller".

== Main contributions ==
His work on TESLA, a protocol for broadcast stream authentication has been standardised by the IETF and ISO/IEC JTC 1, and is used by industry (e.g. Galileo SATNAV)

Perrig has worked on securing routing protocols in ad hoc networks. The Ariadne, and Packet Leashes have had a lasting impact on the community. This work forms the basis for the Zigbee secure sensor communication standard and has had over 5000 citations.

Starting in 2004, Perrig's research group has been studying hardware-based approaches leveraging the newly deployed TPM chip for trustworthy computing. The Flicker and TrustVisor systems (available open-source) were important early systems that guided attestation-based trusted computing research. With Bryan Parno and Jon McCune, Perrig published the introductory book Bootstrapping Trust in Modern Computers".

Starting in 2003, his group proposed software-based attestation, also known as time-based attestation, a mechanism for performing attestation without special hardware support. Although initially met with resistance by the community, the systems stood the test of time (SWATT, PIONEER, SAKE, VIPER) and the research area was pursued by several research groups.

Since 2013, Perrig and his Network Security group at ETH Zürich further develop and introduce new components to the SCION architecture.

== Awards ==
- 2004: NSF CAREER Award
- 2006: Sloan Research Fellowship
- 2011: Benjamin Richard Teare teaching award
- 2013: ACM SIGSAC Outstanding Innovation Award
- 2017: ACM Fellow
- 2020: IEEE Symposium on Security and Privacy, won 4 test of time awards
- 2024: Intel Hardware Security Academic Award, Test of Time Award, for the 2008 EuroSys paper "Flicker: An Execution Infrastructure for TCB Minimization"
