= Computational Complexity Conference =

Academic conference in computer science

The Computational Complexity Conference (CCC) is an academic conference in the field of theoretical computer science whose roots date to 1986. It fosters research in computational complexity theory, and is typically held annually between mid-May and mid-July in North America or Europe. Since 2015, CCC has been organized independently by the Computational Complexity Foundation (CCF).

== History ==
CCC was first organized in 1986 under the name "Structure in Complexity Theory Conference" (Structures) with support from the US National Science Foundation. The conference was sponsored by the IEEE Computer Society Technical Committee on Mathematical Foundations of Computing from 1987 to 2014. In 1996, the conference was renamed the "Annual IEEE Conference on Computational Complexity", thus establishing the current acronym "CCC". In 2014, a movement towards independence and open access proceedings led to the establishment of the CCF. Since 2015, CCF has organized the conference independently under the name CCC, and publishes open access proceedings via Leibniz International Proceedings in Informatics. Future and past conference websites, as well as past programs and call for papers, are archived online.

== Scope ==
CCC broadly targets research in computational complexity theory. This currently includes(but is not limited to the study of models of computation ranging from deterministic to quantum to algebraic, as well as resource constraints such as time, randomness and input queries.

== Logistics ==
CCC is held annually between mid-May and mid-July, with a scientific program running for approximately three days. The conference is composed of a single-track. Activities in addition to the scientific program typically include an opening reception, a rump session and a business meeting.

== Awards ==
CCC annually confers up to two awards: a "Best Student Paper Award", aimed at papers authored solely by students and, since 2001, a "Best Paper Award", given to the most outstanding paper at the year's conference.
