= Faculdade de Ciências e Tecnologia =

Faculdade de Ciências e Tecnologia is Portuguese for "Faculty of Sciences and Technology", and may refer to:

- Faculdade de Ciências e Tecnologia da Universidade do Algarve (FCTUAlg) in the University of the Algarve (UAlg)
- Faculdade de Ciências e Tecnologia da Universidade de Coimbra (FCTUC) in the University of Coimbra (UC)
- Faculdade de Ciências e Tecnologia da Universidade Nova de Lisboa (FCTUNL) in the New University of Lisbon (UNL)
