= Micro-conference =

A micro-conference is a small scale conference that allows researchers to present and discuss their work. They provide a channel for the exchange of nascent ideas and an opportunity for academic collaboration.

== Overview ==
Micro-conferences draw upon a collaborative ‘workshop’ tradition of research and occupy the space between a seminar and an academic conference. Like seminars they bring together small groups to focus on a particular subject and encourage active participation. However, like academic conferences they are usually composed of various research-led presentations and focus upon the informal dissemination of ideas rather than academic instruction. They are short and concise, with participants offering a brief overview or raising research-led questions. These are usually submitted as a short abstract and reviewed before the presentation is accepted.

== See also ==
- Colloquium
- Congress
- Convention (meeting)
- Seminar
- Symposium
- Poster session
- Plenary session
- Professional conference
