= International Symposium on High-Performance Computer Architecture =

Annual academic conference on computer architecture

- Status: Active
- Genre: Academic conference
- Frequency: Annual
- Country: Varies
- Inaugurated: 1995
- Organizer: IEEE Computer Society
- Website: www.hpca-conf.org

The IEEE International Symposium on High-Performance Computer Architecture (HPCA) is an annual academic conference on computer architecture. It was first held in 1995, and the 2026 edition was the thirty-second in the series. The conference is sponsored by the IEEE Computer Society through its Technical Committee on Computer Architecture (TCCA), which describes HPCA as "a premier venue for scientists and engineers to present their latest research findings in the rapidly-changing field of high-performance computer architecture".

Together with ASPLOS, ISCA and the International Symposium on Microarchitecture (MICRO), HPCA is identified as one of the four "core computer architecture venues" in the call for the IEEE Micro Top Picks issue published by TCCA and by ACM SIGARCH. In CSRankings, a ranking that counts publications in selected venues, HPCA is classified as a next-tier architecture venue that is excluded from the default tally and can be enabled by the user.

== History ==
The first symposium was held on 22–25 January 1995 at the Sheraton Inn in Raleigh, North Carolina. Yale Patt of the University of Michigan served as general chair and Laxmi N. Bhuyan of Texas A&M University as program chair; the meeting was sponsored by the IEEE Computer Society Technical Committee on Computer Architecture. Proceedings have appeared every year since.

Since the 2010s the symposium has been co-located with three related conferences, PPoPP, CGO and CC, which are held in the same week and city. The 2021 and 2022 editions, planned for Seoul, were held online.

== Scope ==
The call for papers covers processor, memory and storage architecture; interconnection networks; domain-specific architectures and accelerators; reconfigurable systems; near-memory and in-memory computing; cloud and datacenter systems; embedded, mobile and edge architectures; the effect of circuits and process technology on architecture, including three-dimensional integration, chiplets and wafer-scale designs; modelling and simulation methodology; architectures built on quantum, superconducting and other emerging technologies; and reliability, security, power, energy and sustainability as they relate to computer architecture.

== Review process ==
Submissions are reviewed double-blind, and the call for papers states that the committee sets no target acceptance rate. The schedule includes a separate period in which authors respond to the reviews, and papers previously rejected elsewhere must be accompanied by a letter describing how they were revised.

Authors of accepted papers may submit the software and data underlying their work for optional artifact evaluation, which was first carried out in 2022; successful artifacts receive IEEE reproducibility badges, and participation does not affect the acceptance decision.

Figures reported at the conference business meetings include 260 submissions and 54 accepted papers in 2018, an acceptance rate of 20.7 per cent, and 273 submissions with 80 papers accepted to the main track in 2022.

== Awards ==
The HPCA Test of Time Award was first presented in 2018 and recognises the most influential paper from earlier editions of the symposium. Eligible papers are those published between eighteen and twenty-two years before the award year; a paper with at least one hundred citations in Google Scholar is nominated automatically, and authors may not nominate their own work. The winner is chosen by a committee of five members serving staggered three-year terms. Ten papers have received the award, two of them in 2021.

A Best Paper Award is selected by the program committee of each edition. TCCA also maintains an HPCA Hall of Fame listing authors with eight or more papers at the symposium; the threshold was raised from six to eight in 2018 to match the corresponding lists for ISCA and MICRO.

== Conferences ==
Edition	Year	Location
HPCA-33	2027	Salt Lake City, United States
HPCA-32	2026	Sydney, Australia
HPCA-31	2025	Las Vegas, United States
HPCA-30	2024	Edinburgh, United Kingdom
HPCA-29	2023	Montreal, Canada
HPCA-28	2022	Seoul, South Korea (online)
HPCA-27	2021	Seoul, South Korea (online)
HPCA-26	2020	San Diego, United States
HPCA-25	2019	Washington, D.C., United States
HPCA-24	2018	Vienna, Austria
HPCA-23	2017	Austin, United States
HPCA-22	2016	Barcelona, Spain
HPCA-21	2015	Burlingame, United States
HPCA-20	2014	Orlando, United States
HPCA-19	2013	Shenzhen, China
HPCA-18	2012	New Orleans, United States
HPCA-17	2011	San Antonio, United States
HPCA-16	2010	Bangalore, India
HPCA-15	2009	Raleigh, United States
HPCA-14	2008	Salt Lake City, United States
HPCA-13	2007	Phoenix, United States
HPCA-12	2006	Austin, United States
HPCA-11	2005	San Francisco, United States
HPCA-10	2004	Madrid, Spain
HPCA-9	2003	Anaheim, United States
HPCA-8	2002	Boston, United States
HPCA-7	2001	Nuevo León, Mexico
HPCA-6	2000	Toulouse, France
HPCA-5	1999	Orlando, United States
HPCA-4	1998	Las Vegas, United States
HPCA-3	1997	San Antonio, United States
HPCA-2	1996	San Jose, United States
HPCA-1	1995	Raleigh, United States

Editions up to HPCA-25 are numbered in the list maintained by TCCA; locations and dates follow the proceedings records.
