= ACM SIGOPS =

ACM's Special Interest Group on Operating Systems

Association for Computing Machinery Special Interest Group on Operating Systems (SIGOPS)
- Purpose: Operating Systems
- Region served: International
- Website: www.sigops.org

ACM SIGOPS is the Association for Computing Machinery's Special Interest Group on Operating Systems, an international community of students, faculty, researchers, and practitioners associated with research and development related to operating systems. The organization sponsors international conferences related to computer systems, operating systems, computer architectures, distributed computing, and virtual environments. In addition, the organization offers multiple awards recognizing outstanding participants in the field, including the Dennis M. Ritchie Doctoral Dissertation Award, in honor of Dennis Ritchie, co-creator of the C programming language and Unix operating system.

== History ==
In 1965, Henriette Avram started the ACM Special Interest Committee on Time-Sharing (SICTIME), and Arthur M. Rosenberg became the first chair. In 1968, the name was changed to ACM SIGOPS. By 1969, the organization included nearly 1000 members.

== Conferences ==
ACM SIGOPS sponsors the following industry conferences, some independently and some in partnership with industry participants such as ACM SIGPLAN, USENIX, Oracle, Microsoft, and VMWare.

- APSYS: Asia-Pacific Workshop on Systems
- ASPLOS: International Conference on Architectural Support for Programming Languages and Operating Systems
- EuroSys: European Conference on Computer Systems
- OSDI: USENIX Symposium on Operating Systems Design and Implementation
- PODC: Symposium on Principles of Distributed Computing
- SOCC: International Symposium on Cloud Computing
- SOSP: Symposium on Operating Systems Principles
- SYSTOR: ACM International Systems and Storage Conference
- VEE: International Conference on Virtual Execution Environments

== Hall of Fame ==
ACM SIGOPS includes a Hall of Fame Award, started in 2005, recognizing influential papers from ten or more years in the past. Notable recipients include:

- Leslie Lamport (2013)
- Barbara Liskov (2012)
- Richard Rashid
- Dennis Ritchie (2002)

== Journal ==
ACM SIGOPS publishes the Operating Systems Review (OSR), a forum for topics including operating systems and architecture for multiprogramming, multiprocessing, and time-sharing, and computer system modeling and analysis.

== See also ==
- Cloud computing
- Computer engineering
- Computer multitasking
- Computer science
- Computing
- Kernel
- List of operating systems
- Operating system
- Timeline of operating systems
- Virtual machine
