= International Symposium on Fundamentals of Computation Theory =

FCT, the International Symposia on Fundamentals of Computation Theory is a biennial series of conferences in the field of theoretical computer science. It was established in 1977 for researchers interested in all aspects of theoretical computer science, particularly algorithms, computational complexity, and formal and logical methods. FCT was previously held at the following institutions.

year	institution	location
1977	--	Poznań, Poland
1979	--	Wendisch Rietz, Germany
1981	University of Szeged	Szeged, Hungary
1983	--	Borgholm, Sweden
1985	--	Cottbus, Germany
1987	Kazan State University	Kazan, Russia
1989	University of Szeged	Szeged, Hungary
1991	--	Gosen-Berlin, Germany
1993	University of Szeged	Szeged, Hungary
1995	Technische Universität Dresden	Dresden, Germany
1997	Jagiellonian University	Kraków, Poland
1999	Alexandru Ioan Cuza University	Iași, Romania
2001	University of Latvia	Riga, Latvia
2003	Malmö University	Malmö, Sweden
2005	University of Lübeck	Lübeck, Germany
2007	Hungarian Academy of Sciences	Budapest, Hungary
2009	University of Wrocław	Wrocław, Poland
2011	University of Oslo	Oslo, Norway
2013	Liverpool University	Liverpool, UK
2015	Gdańsk University of Technology	Gdańsk, Poland
2017	University of Bordeaux	Bordeaux, France
2019	University of Copenhagen	Copenhagen, Denmark
2021	National Technical University of Athens	Athens, Greece
2023	Trier University	Trier, Germany
2025	University of Wrocław	Wrocław, Poland

== See also ==
- Conferences in theoretical computer science.
- The list of computer science conferences contains other academic conferences in computer science.
