= International Symposium on Microarchitecture =

MICRO, IEEE/ACM International Symposium on Microarchitecture
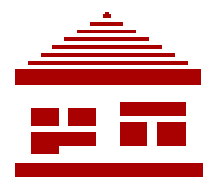
- Status: Active
- Genre: Computer Architecture Conference
- Inaugurated: 1968 (Bedford, Massachusetts)
- Most recent: 2025 (Seoul, South Korea)
- Organizer: ACM SIGMICRO and IEEE Computer Society
- Website: microarch.org

The IEEE/ACM International Symposium on Microarchitecture^{®} (MICRO) is an annual academic conference on microarchitecture, generally viewed as the top-tier academic conference on computer architecture. It is not to be confused with a micro-conference. Particularly within the domains of microarchitecture and Code generation (compiler), MICRO is unrivaled and esteemed as the premier forum. Association for Computing Machinery's Special Interest Group on Microarchitecture (ACM SIGMICRO) and Institute of Electrical and Electronics Engineers Computer Society are technical sponsors.

MICRO Hall of Fame provides a list of the most prolific authors at the ISCA conference, spanning contributions starting from the first ISCA conference in 1973.

== Events ==
Event	Year	Location
MICRO-1	1968	Bedford, Massachusetts, United States
MICRO-2	1969	Phoenix, Arizona, United States
MICRO-3	1970	Buffalo, New York, United States
MICRO-4	1971	Santa Cruz, California, United States
MICRO-5	1972	Champaign–Urbana, Illinois, United States
MICRO-6	1973	College Park, Maryland, United States
MICRO-7	1974	Palo Alto, California, United States
MICRO-8	1975	Chicago, Illinois, United States
MICRO-9	1976	New Orleans, Louisiana, United States
MICRO-10	1977	Niagara Falls, New York, United States
MICRO-11	1978	Asilomar (Pacific Grove), California, United States
MICRO-12	1979	Hershey, Pennsylvania, United States
MICRO-13	1980	Colorado Springs, Colorado, United States
MICRO-14	1981	Chatham (Cape Cod), Massachusetts, United States
MICRO-15	1982	Palo Alto, California, United States
MICRO-16	1983	Downingtown, Pennsylvania, United States
MICRO-17	1984	New Orleans, Louisiana, United States
MICRO-18	1985	Pacific Grove (Asilomar), California, United States
MICRO-19	1986	New York, New York, United States
MICRO-20	1987	Colorado Springs, Colorado, United States
MICRO-21	1988	San Diego, California, United States
MICRO-22	1989	Dublin, Ireland
MICRO-23	1990	Orlando, Florida, United States
MICRO-24	1991	Albuquerque, New Mexico, United States
MICRO-25	1992	Portland, Oregon, United States
MICRO-26	1993	Austin, Texas, United States
MICRO-27	1994	San Jose, California, United States
MICRO-28	1995	Ann Arbor, Michigan, United States
MICRO-29	1996	Paris, France
MICRO-30	1997	Research Triangle Park, North Carolina, United States
MICRO-31	1998	Dallas, Texas, United States
MICRO-32	1999	Haifa, Israel
MICRO-33	2000	Monterey, California, United States
MICRO-34	2001	Austin, Texas, United States
MICRO-35	2002	Istanbul, Turkey
MICRO-36	2003	San Diego, California, United States
MICRO-37	2004	Portland, Oregon, United States
MICRO-38	2005	Barcelona, Spain
MICRO-39	2006	Orlando, Florida, United States
MICRO-40	2007	Chicago, Illinois, United States
MICRO-41	2008	Lake Como, Italy
MICRO-42	2009	New York, New York, United States
MICRO-43	2010	Atlanta, Georgia, United States
MICRO-44	2011	Porto Alegre, Brazil
MICRO-45	2012	Vancouver, British Columbia, Canada
MICRO-46	2013	Davis, California, United States
MICRO-47	2014	Cambridge, United Kingdom
MICRO-48	2015	Waikiki (Honolulu), Hawaii, United States
MICRO-49	2016	Taipei, Taiwan
MICRO-50	2017	Boston, Massachusetts, United States
MICRO-51	2018	Fukuoka, Japan
MICRO-52	2019	Columbus, Ohio, United States
MICRO-53	2020	Athens (online), Greece
MICRO-54	2021	Athens (online), Greece
MICRO-55	2022	Chicago, Illinois, United States
MICRO-56	2023	Toronto, Ontario, Canada
MICRO-57	2024	Austin, Texas, United States
MICRO-58	2025	Seoul, South Korea
MICRO-59	2026	Athens, Greece

== MICRO Test of Time (ToT) Award ==
The SIGMICRO Test of Time (ToT) Award recognizes influential papers from prior editions of the International Symposium on Microarchitecture (MICRO). It was first awarded in 2014 (a special inaugural year recognizing 10 papers from 1968–1992) and has since been awarded annually, typically to papers published 18–22 years prior to the award year.

Recent and past recipients

- 2024 (for MICRO 2006): Utility-Based Cache Partitioning: A Low-Overhead, High-Performance, Runtime Mechanism to Partition Shared Caches — Moinuddin K. Qureshi; Yale N. Patt.
- 2023 (for MICRO 2003): Orion: A Power-Performance Simulator for Interconnection Networks — Hang-Sheng Wang; Xinping Zhu; Li-Shiuan Peh; Sharad Malik.
- 2022 (for MICRO 2003): A Systematic Methodology to Compute the Architectural Vulnerability Factors for a High-Performance Microprocessor — Shubhendu S. Mukherjee; Christopher T. Weaver; Joel S. Emer; Steven K. Reinhardt; Todd M. Austin.
- 2022 (for MICRO 2003): Runtime Power Monitoring in High-End Processors: Methodology and Empirical Data — Canturk Isci; Margaret Martonosi.
- 2021 (for MICRO 2003): Razor: A Low-Power Pipeline Based on Circuit-Level Timing Speculation — Dan Ernst; Nam Sung Kim; Shidhartha Das; Sanjay Pant; Rajeev R. Rao; Toan Pham; Conrad H. Ziesler; David T. Blaauw; Todd M. Austin; Krisztián Flautner; Trevor N. Mudge.
- 2021 (for MICRO 2003): Single-ISA Heterogeneous Multi-Core Architectures: The Potential for Processor Power Reduction — Rakesh Kumar; Keith I. Farkas; Norman P. Jouppi; Parthasarathy Ranganathan; Dean M. Tullsen.
- 2020 (for MICRO 2000): A Permutation-Based Page Interleaving Scheme to Reduce Row-Buffer Conflicts and Exploit Data Locality — Zhao Zhang; Zhichun Zhu; Xiaodong Zhang.
- 2020 (for MICRO 1999): Fetch Directed Instruction Prefetching — Glenn Reinman; Brad Calder; Todd M. Austin.
- 2020 (for MICRO 1998): A Dynamic Multithreading Processor — Haitham Akkary; Michael A. Driscoll.
- 2019 (for MICRO 2001): Speculative Lock Elision: Enabling Highly Concurrent Multithreaded Execution — Ravi Rajwar; James R. Goodman.
- 2019 (for MICRO 1999): Selective Cache Ways: On-Demand Cache Resource Allocation — David H. Albonesi.
- 2018 (for MICRO 1999): DIVA: A Reliable Substrate for Deep Submicron Microarchitecture Design — Todd M. Austin.
- 2018 (for MICRO 1996): Assigning Confidence to Conditional Branch Predictions — Erik Jacobsen; Eric Rotenberg; James E. Smith.
- 2018 (for MICRO 1996): Efficient Path Profiling — Thomas Ball; James R. Larus.
- 2017 (for MICRO 1996): Exceeding the Dataflow Limit Via Value Prediction — Mikko H. Lipasti; John Paul Shen.
- 2016 (for MICRO 1994): Iterative Modulo Scheduling: An Algorithm for Software Pipelining Loops — B. Ramakrishna Rau.
- 2015 (for MICRO 1996): Trace Cache: A Low Latency Approach to High Bandwidth Instruction Fetching — Eric Rotenberg; Steve Bennett; James E. Smith.
- 2014 (inaugural set of 10 papers from 1968–1992).
