= International Symposium on Reliable Distributed Systems =

The International Symposium on Reliable Distributed Systems (SRDS) is an academic conference covering distributed systems design and development, particularly with properties such as reliability, availability, safety, security and real time. The symposium is traditionally a single track event held over three days with a number of associated workshops staged a day before the symposium starts. SRDS is sponsored by the IEEE Computer Society Technical Committee on Distributed Processing.

SRDS was first organised in 1981; since then, the symposium has been organised in 1982, 1983, 1984, and annually from 1986.

== See also ==
- The list of distributed computing conferences contains other academic conferences in distributed computing.
- The list of computer science conferences contains other academic conferences in computer science.
