= International Conference on Computational Intelligence Methods for Bioinformatics and Biostatistics =

Yearly scientific conference

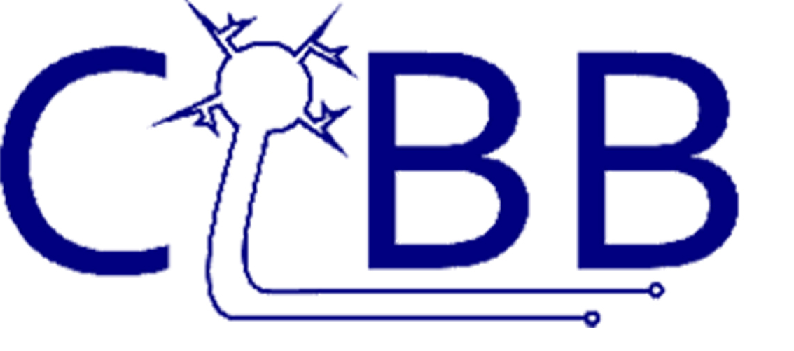
- Genre: Scientific conference
- Frequency: yearly
- Location: Various
- Years active: 22
- Inaugurated: CIBB 2004, Perugia, Italy, EU
- Previous event: CIBB 2026, Rome, Italy
- Next event: CIBB 2027, Turin, Italy
- Organiser: Yearly local organizing committees
- Website: CIBB Conference Series Official Website

The International Conference on Computational Intelligence Methods for Bioinformatics and Biostatistics (CIBB) is an annual scientific conference focused on machine learning and computational intelligence methods applied to bioinformatics, biostatistics, and medical informatics.

== Organization and history ==
The CIBB conferences used to be organized by members of the IEEE Computational Intelligence Society (IEEE CIS), the International Neural Network Society (INNS), and groups of local committees. Since 2021, each edition has been organized by ad hoc local committees composed of professors and students from the host institution. The conference main themes are machine learning, data mining, and computational intelligence algorithms applied to biological, medical and biostatistical problems.

The CIBB conference was originally started by Francesco Masulli (Università di Genova), Antonina Starita (Università di Pisa), and Roberto Tagliaferri (Università di Salerno) as a special session within other international conferences held in Italy: the 14th Italian Workshop on Neural Networks (2004), the 6th International Workshop on Fuzzy Logic and Applications (2005), the 7th International Fuzzy Logic and Intelligent Technologies in Nuclear Science Conference on Applied Artificial Intelligence (2006), and the 7th International Workshop on Fuzzy Logic and Applications (2007). Following the participation in these sessions, the CIBB steering committee decided to establish CIBB as an autonomous conference starting with the 2008 edition in Vietri sul Mare, Italy.

During their first editions, the CIBB conferences were organized and attended mainly by Italian researchers at various academic locations throughout Italy. Later editions of the conference were also organized outside Italy. The 2012 CIBB conference was held for the first time outside Europe, in Houston, Texas.

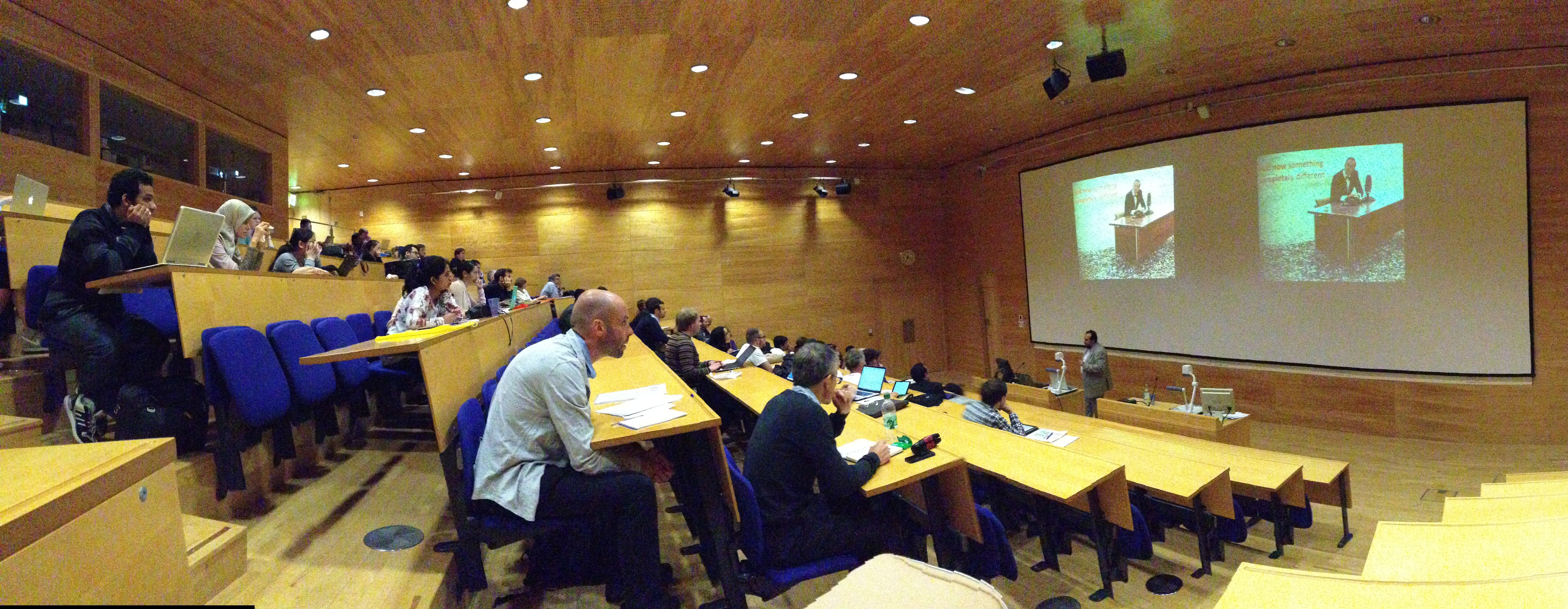
CIBB 2014 conference in Cambridge, Great Britain

== Format ==
The conference typically includes invited talks together with oral and poster presentations of peer-reviewed papers.

It usually lasts three days in September, and traditionally includes some special sessions about the application of computational intelligence to specific aspects of biology (for example, the "Special session on machine learning in health informatics and biological systems" at CIBB 2018,) and occasionally some tutorials.

At the 2011 conference edition in Gargnano, the scientific committee gave a young researcher best paper award.

== Publications ==
Proceedings of the conferences are published as a book series by Springer Science+Business Media, whereas selected papers are published in journals such as BMC Bioinformatics and BMC Medical Informatics and Decision Making.

== Editions ==
Upcoming:

- (Italy) CIBB 2027 – 22nd edition.

Past:

- CIBB 2026, September 2–4, Rome, Italy, EU – 21st edition.
- CIBB 2025, September 10–12, Milan, Italy, EU – 20th edition.
- CIBB 2024, September 4–6, Benevento, Italy, EU – 19th edition.
- CIBB 2023, September 4–6, Padua, Italy, EU – 18th edition.
- CIBB 2021, November 15–17, online, virtual edition – 17th edition.
- CIBB 2019, September 4–6, Bergamo, Italy, EU – 16th edition.
- CIBB 2018, September 6–8, Almada, Portugal, EU – 15th edition.
- CIBB 2017, September 7–9 Cagliari, Italy, EU – 14th edition.
- CIBB 2016, September 1–3, Stirling, Scotland, United Kingdom – 13th edition.
- CIBB 2015, September 10–12, Naples, Italy, EU – 12th edition.
- CIBB 2014, June 26–28, Cambridge, England, United Kingdom – 11th edition.
- CIBB 2013, June 20–22, Nice, France, EU – 10th edition. Preceded by PRIB 2013.
- (United States) CIBB 2012, July 12–14, Houston, Texas, USA – 9th edition.
- CIBB 2011, June 30–July 2, Gargnano, Italy, EU – 8th edition.
- CIBB 2010, September 16–18, Palermo, Italy, EU – 7th edition.
- CIBB 2009, October 15–17, Genoa, Italy, EU – 6th edition.
- CIBB 2008, October 3–4, Vietri sul Mare, Italy, EU – 5th edition.
- CIBB 2007, July 7–10, Camogli, Italy, EU – 4th edition. Special session of WILF 2007.
- CIBB 2006, August 30, Genoa, Italy, EU – 3rd edition. Special session of FLINS 2006.
- CIBB 2005, September 15–17, Crema, Italy, EU – 2nd edition. Special session of WILF 2005.
- CIBB 2004, September 14–15, Perugia, Italy, EU – 1st edition. Special session of WIRN 2004.

== See also ==
- Conference on Neural Information Processing Systems (NeurIPS)
- European Conference on Computational Biology (ECCB)
- European Conference on Machine Learning and Principles and Practice of Knowledge Discovery in Databases (ECML PKDD)
- International Conference on Machine Learning (ICML)
