= ISSRE =

IEEE annual conference series on reliability engineering for software

The International Symposium on Software Reliability Engineering (IEEE ISSRE) is an academic conference with strong industry participation running since 1990 and covering reliability engineering for software. The first meeting was organized at Washington DC. In addition to cities in USA, it has also been held in Paderborn, Germany, Hong Kong, Saint Malo, Bretagne, France, Trollhattan, Sweden, Mysuru, India, Hiroshima, Japan, Naples, Italy and Ottawa, Canada and Toulouse, France. It is interested in properties such as reliability, availability, safety, security and quality of software. It is sponsored by the IEEE Computer Society. The symposium usually last 4 days and has integrated workshops and tutorials in a multi-track program.

John Musa, the pioneering researcher at AT&T Bell Labs, who is regarded to be the father of Software Reliability Engineering, served as a guide and an advisor for ISSRE since its inception.

== See also ==
- The list of computer science conferences contains other academic conferences in computer science.
