= Operating Systems Design and Implementation =

- Abbreviation: OSDI
- Discipline: Systems research

Publication details
- Publisher: USENIX
- History: 1994–
- Frequency: annual (since 2021)

The Symposium on Operating Systems Design and Implementation (OSDI), organized by USENIX, is one of the two top academic conferences on systems research, along with SOSP. A number of notable systems were first published as OSDI papers, including MapReduce, Bigtable, Spanner, and TensorFlow.

== History ==
Until the early 1990s, SOSP was the main venue for the systems community to meet and publish work, but it was held only once every two years. In 1994, this led to the creation of OSDI as an alternative venue for years in which SOSP was not held. The idea came from Jay Lepreau, who also served as the first program chair. In the following years, OSDI and SOSP took turns as the top-tier systems conference of the year; both published papers of similar depth and quality, with OSDI putting somewhat more emphasis on implementation. However, the systems community kept growing and, as single-track conferences, both could accept only a limited number of papers; thus, acceptance rates dropped significantly. This led to a community proposal to turn both into annual conferences, which was accepted by SIGOPS. As a result, OSDI became an annual conference in 2021.

== Locations ==
- 1994: Monterey, CA
- 1996: Seattle, WA
- 1999: New Orleans, LA
- 2000: San Diego, CA
- 2002: Boston, MA
- 2004: San Francisco, CA
- 2006: Seattle, WA
- 2008: San Diego, CA
- 2010: Vancouver, BC
- 2012: Hollywood, CA
- 2014: Broomfield, CO
- 2016: Savannah, GA
- 2018: Carlsbad, CA
- 2020: (virtual)
- 2021: (virtual)
- 2022: Carlsbad, CA
- 2023: Boston, MA
- 2024: Santa Clara, CA
- 2025: Boston, MA
- 2026: Seattle, WA

== See also ==
- List of computer science conferences
