= International Conference on Architectural Support for Programming Languages and Operating Systems =

The International Conference on Architectural Support for Programming Languages and Operating Systems (ASPLOS) is an annual interdisciplinary computer science conference organized by the Association for Computing Machinery (ACM).

Reflecting its focus, sponsorship of the conference is made up of 50% by the ACM's Special Interest Group on Computer Architecture (SIGARCH) and 25% by each of the Special Interest Group on Programming Languages (SIGPLAN) and the Special Interest Group on Operating Systems (SIGOPS). It is a high-impact conference in computer architecture and operating systems, but less so in programming languages/software engineering.

== See also ==
- List of computer science conferences
