= USENIX =

Organization supporting operating system research

- USENIX: The Advanced Computing Systems Association
- Formation: 1975; 51 years ago
- Headquarters: Berkeley, California, United States
- President: William Enck
- Website: www.usenix.org

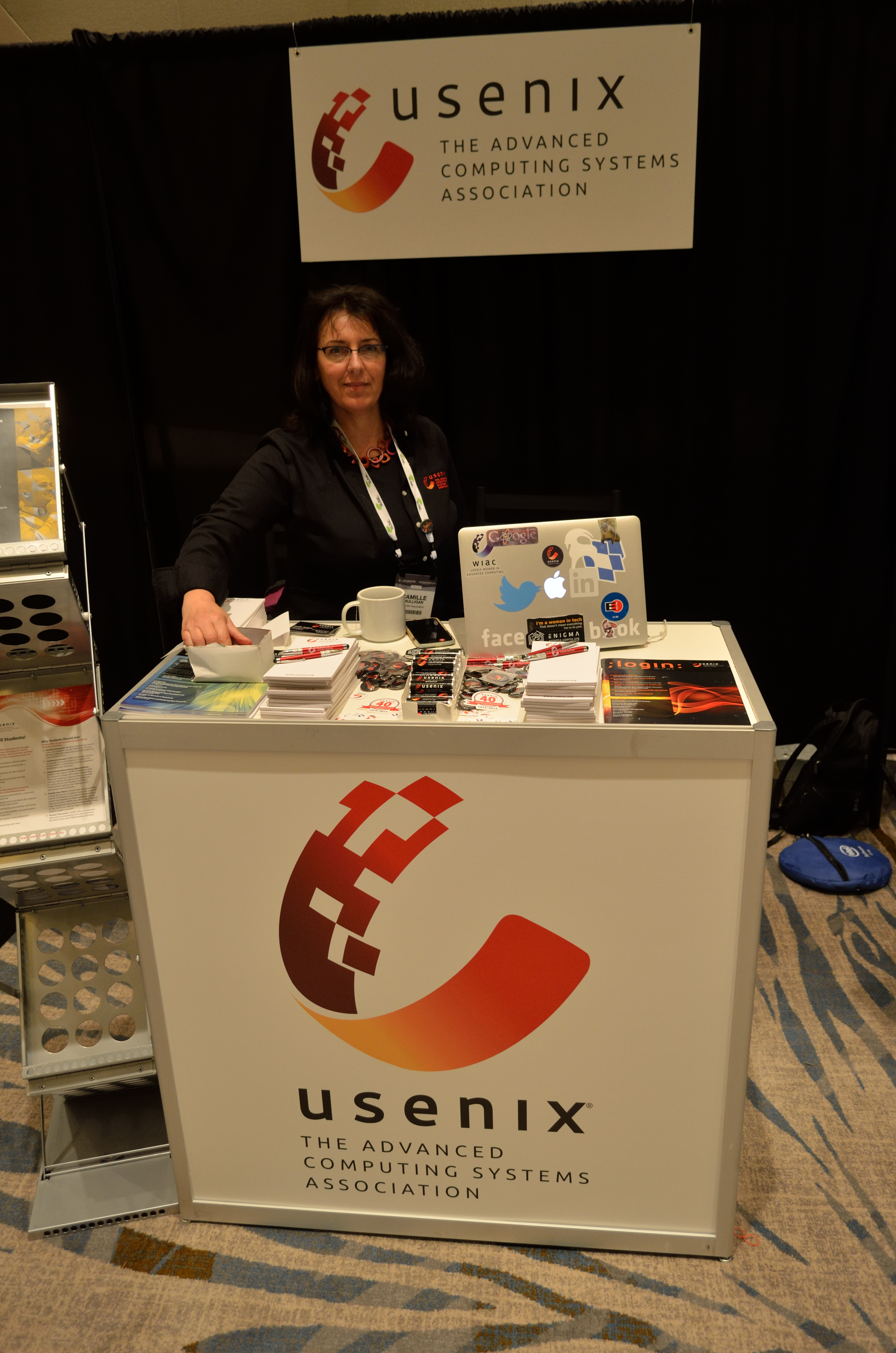
USENIX booth at Linuxcon 2016

USENIX is an American 501(c)(3) nonprofit membership organization based in Berkeley, California and founded in 1975 that supports advanced computing systems, operating system (OS), and computer networking research. It organizes several conferences in these fields.

== History ==
USENIX was established in 1975 under the name "Unix Users Group," focusing primarily on the study and development of the Unix OS family and similar systems. In June 1977, a lawyer from AT&T Corporation informed the group that they could not use the word "Unix" in their name as it was a trademark of Western Electric (the manufacturing arm of AT&T until 1995), which led to the change of name to USENIX. Since its founding, it has published a technical journal titled ;login:.

USENIX was started as a technical organization. As commercial interest grew, a number of separate groups started in parallel, most notably the Software Tools Users Group (STUG), a technical adjunct for Unix-like tools and interfaces on non-Unix operating systems, and /usr/group, a commercially oriented user group.

USENIX's founding President was Lou Katz.

== Conferences ==
USENIX hosts numerous conferences and symposia each year, including:

- USENIX Symposium on Operating Systems Design and Implementation (OSDI) (was bi-annual till 2020)
- USENIX Security Symposium (USENIX Security)
- USENIX Conference on File and Storage Technologies (FAST)
- USENIX Symposium on Networked Systems Design and Implementation (NSDI)
- SREcon, a conference for engineers focused on site reliability, systems engineering, and working with complex distributed systems at scale
- LISA, the Large Installation System Administration Conference was retired in after LISA21, which was the 34th LISA conference.
- Enigma, a conference focused on practical privacy and security expertise and knowledge sharing in a welcoming and inclusive environment, was paused after Enigma 2023 and was later folded into USENIX Security.

Until 2025, it also hosted an Annual Technical Conference (USENIX ATC).

== Publications ==
USENIX published a magazine called ;login: that was published bi-monthly until 2016, then four times a year until 2021. In 2021, it became an all-digital magazine and openly accessible. ;login: Online concluded publication in 2025. ;login: content informed the community about practically relevant research, useful tools, and relevant events. ;login: issues, print and online, are online.

From 1988–1996, USENIX published the quarterly journal Computing Systems, about the theory and implementation of advanced computing systems in the UNIX tradition. It was published first by the University of California Press, then by the MIT Press. The issues have been scanned and are online.

== Open access ==
USENIX conferences became open access in 2008. Since 2011, they have provided audio and video recordings of paper presentations and conference talks in their open-access materials, free of charge.

== USENIX Lifetime Achievement Award ==
This award, also called the "Flame" award, has been presented since 1993.

- 2026 Rob Pike
- 2025 Rik Farrow
- 2024 Arnold Robbins
- 2023 Steven M. Bellovin, Matt Blaze, and Susan Landau
- 2022 Warren Toomey
- 2021 (no award)
- 2020 Chet Ramey
- 2019 Margo Seltzer
- 2018 Eddie Kohler
- 2014 Thomas E. Anderson
- 2012 John Mashey
- 2011 Dan Geer
- 2010 Ward Cunningham
- 2009 Gerald J. Popek
- 2008 Andrew S. Tanenbaum
- 2007 Peter Honeyman
- 2006 Radia Perlman
- 2005 Michael Stonebraker
- 2004 M. Douglas McIlroy
- 2003 Rick Adams
- 2002 James Gosling
- 2001 The GNU Project and all its contributors
- 2000 W. Richard Stevens
- 1999 "The X Window System Community at Large"
- 1998 Tim Berners-Lee
- 1997 Brian W. Kernighan
- 1996 The Software Tools Users Group (Dennis E. Hall, Deborah Scherrer, Joe Sventek)
- 1995 The Creation of USENET by Jim Ellis, Steven M. Bellovin, and Tom Truscott
- 1994 Networking Technologies
- 1993 Berkeley UNIX

== See also ==
- AUUG
- LISA (conference)
- Marshall Kirk McKusick
- LISA SIG: Formerly SAGE (organization)
- Unix
