= Design Automation Conference =

Annual technology conference

DAC, The Chips to Systems Conference
- Status: Active
- Frequency: Annual
- Years active: 62
- Founded: May 6, 1964; 62 years ago in Cambridge, Massachusetts, United States
- Founder: Pasquale (Pat) Pistilli
- Most recent: DAC 2026
- Next event: DAC 2027
- Participants: 6000
- Area: Electronic Design Automation
- Sponsors: ACM Special Interest Group on Design Automation and IEEE Council on Electronic Design Automation
- Website: The Chips To Systems Conference

DAC, The Chips to Systems Conference (previously known as the Design Automation Conference) is an annual event that combines a technical conference with a trade show. It focuses on semiconductor and electronic system design, covering topics such as electronic design automation (EDA), artificial intelligence (AI) hardware and AI-driven algorithms for hardware design, system on chip (SoC) architecture, low-power electronics, design for manufacturability (DFM), hardware security, physical design, IP cores, chiplets, and embedded systems.

== Program ==
In 2024 DAC received 1545 research paper submissions. A technical program committee of 266 domain experts performed a double-blind review, selecting 337 papers (22%) for publication in the proceedings.

DAC also includes an Engineering Track for industry professionals and technical managers. This track addresses front-end design, back-end design, IP, and embedded systems and software. Submissions to the Engineering Track undergo a separate peer-review process conducted by a dedicated committee.

The trade show features approximately 100 companies in the field of design automation such as Cadence Design Systems, Synopsys, Siemens EDA and Ansys.

The DAC Young Fellows Program at DAC supports graduate students and early-career researchers in the field. The program provides approximately 150 participants with mentorship, travel grants, networking opportunities, and access to conference sessions, fostering their professional growth.

The Ph.D. Forum at DAC is a poster session for Ph.D. students to present and discuss their dissertation research with the EDA community.

HACK@DAC is a hardware security challenge contest for finding and exploiting security-critical vulnerabilities in hardware and firmware.

DAC is organized by hundreds of volunteer committee members from industry and academia. The conference is sponsored by two professional societies:

- ACM-SIGDA (Association for Computing Machinery, Special Interest Group on Design Automation) and
- IEEE-CEDA (Institute of Electrical and Electronics Engineers, IEEE Council on Electronic Design Automation), in technical cooperation with IEEE-SSCS (IEEE Solid-State Circuits Society).

The conference is usually held in June or July.

== Origins ==
DAC is the oldest and largest conference in EDA, starting in 1964. It grew out of the SHARE ("Society to Help Avoid Redundant Effort") design automation workshop. Its originators Marie Pistilli and Pasquale (Pat) Pistilli were honored by the EDA community. Pat received the highest honor in EDA industry, the Phil Kaufman Award, for this effort, and Marie was honored by having an award established in her name, the Marie Pistilli Award.

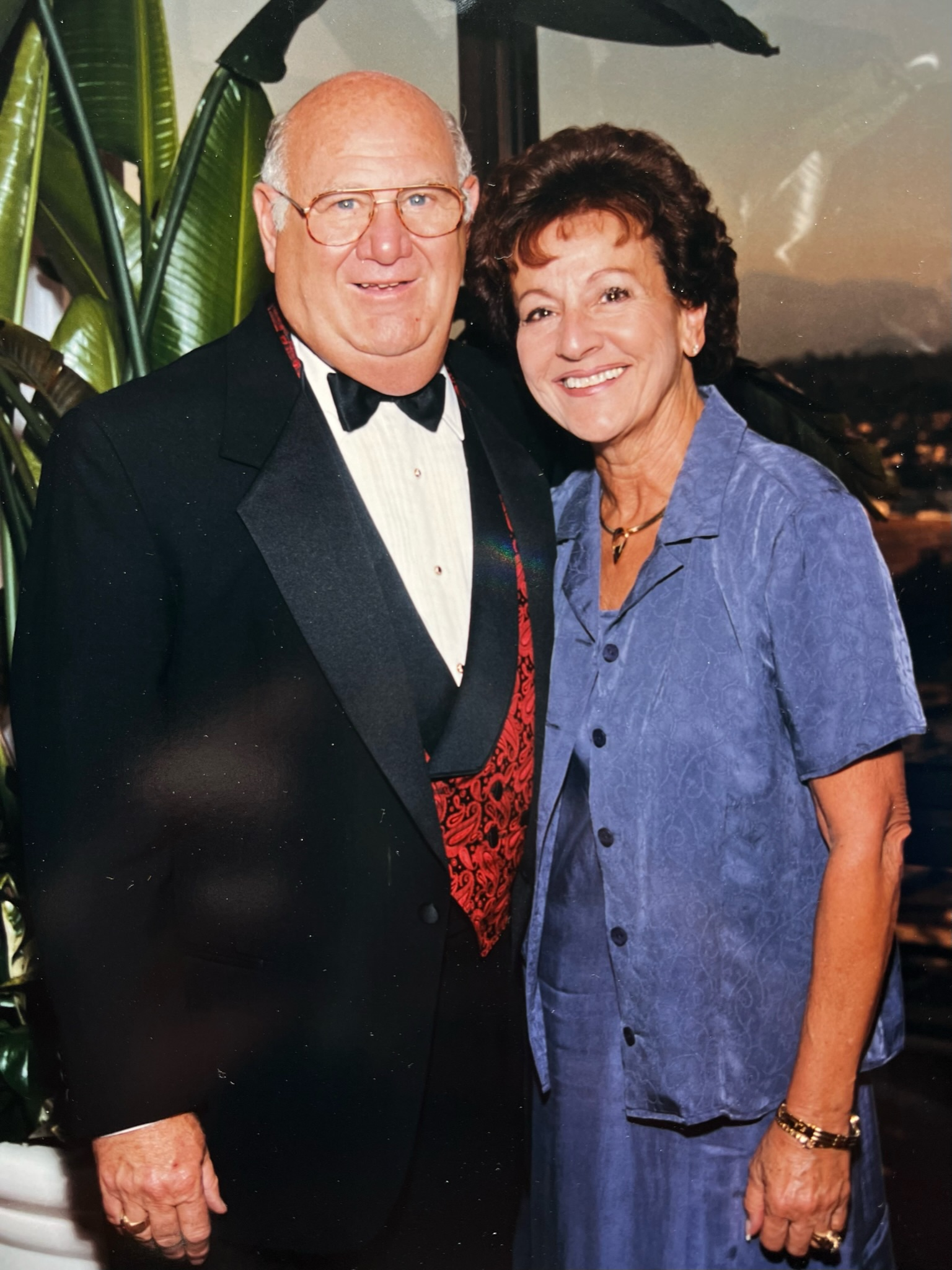
Marie and Pat Pistilli at DAC in 2000

Up until the mid-'70s, DAC had sessions on all types of design automation, including mechanical and architectural. After that, for all intents and purposes, the focus shifted to electronic design. Currently, the topics at DAC also include embedded systems, autonomous systems, Artificial Intelligence hardware, hardware security, and Intellectual Property.

Also until the mid-'70s, DAC was strictly a technical conference. Then a few companies started to request space to show their products, and within a few years, the trade show portion of DAC became the main focus of the event. The first DAC with a dedicated exhibit hall was held in June 1983. As a rough metric of the importance of the trade show portion, about 6,300 people attended DAC in 2018, whereas ICCAD, at least as strong technically but with no trade show, drew perhaps a tenth as many attendees.

== Recent history ==
The table below shows the edition, year, location, and the general chair of recent DAC events.

Key
†	Denotes future event

Edition	Year	Location	Conference center	General chair
20th	1983	Miami Beach, Florida	Fontainebleau Miami Beach	Charles E. Radke
21th	1984	Albuquerque, New Mexico	Albuquerque Convention Center	Patricia H. Lambert
22th	1985	Las Vegas, Nevada	Caesars Palace	Hillel Ofek
23th	1986	Las Vegas, Nevada	Caesars Palace	Dan Nash
24th	1987	Miami Beach, Florida	Miami Beach Convention Center	Lawrence A. O'Neill
25th	1988	Anaheim California	Anaheim Convention Center	Dennis W. Shaklee
26th	1989	Las Vegas, Nevada	Las Vegas Convention Center	Don Thomas
27th	1990	Orlando, Florida	Orange County Convention Center	Richard Smith
28th	1991	San Francisco, California	Moscone Center	A. Richard Newton
29th	1992	Anaheim, California	Anaheim Convention Center	Daniel Schweikert
30th	1993	Dallas, Texas	Kay Bailey Hutchison Convention Center	Alfred Dunlop
31st	1994	San Diego, California	San Diego Convention Center	Michael Lorenzetti
32nd	1995	San Francisco, California	Moscone Center	Bryan Preas
33rd	1996	Las Vegas, Nevada	Las Vegas Convention Center	Thomas Pennino
34th	1997	Anaheim, California	Anaheim Convention Center	Ellen Yoffa
35th	1998	San Francisco, California	Moscone Center	Basant Chawla
36th	1999	New Orleans, Louisiana	New Orleans Morial Convention Center	Mary Jane Irwin
37th	2000	Los Angeles, California	Los Angeles Convention Center	Giovanni De Micheli
38th	2001	Las Vegas, Nevada	Las Vegas Convention Center	Jan M. Rabaey
39th	2002	New Orleans, Louisiana	New Orleans Morial Convention Center	Bryan Ackland
40th	2003	Anaheim, California	Anaheim Convention Center	Ian Getreu
41st	2004	San Diego, California	San Diego Convention Center	Sharad Malik
42nd	2005	Anaheim, California	Anaheim Convention Center	William H. Joyner Jr.
43rd	2006	San Francisco, California	Moscone Center	Ellen Sentovich
44th	2007	San Diego, California	San Diego Convention Center	Steven Levitan
45th	2008	Anaheim, California	Anaheim Convention Center	Limor Fix
46th	2009	San Francisco, California	Moscone Center	Andrew Kahng
47th	2010	Anaheim, California	Anaheim Convention Center	Sachin Sapatnekar
48th	2011	San Diego, California	San Diego Convention Center	Leon Stok
49th	2012	San Francisco, California	Moscone Center	Patrick Groeneveld
50th	2013	Austin, Texas	Austin Convention Center	Yervant Zorian
51st	2014	San Francisco, California	Moscone Center	Soha Hassoun
52nd	2015	San Francisco, California	Moscone Center	Anne Cirkel
53rd	2016	Austin, Texas	Austin Convention Center	Chuck Alpert
54th	2017	Austin, Texas	Austin Convention Center	Mac McNamara
55th	2018	San Francisco, California	Moscone Center	Xiaobo Sharon Hu
56th	2019	Las Vegas, Nevada	Las Vegas Convention Center	Rob Aitken
57th	2020	Virtual due to COVID-19	—N/a	Zhuo Li
58th	2021	San Francisco, California	Moscone Center	Harry Foster
59th	2022	San Francisco, California	Moscone Center	Rob Oshana
60th	2023	San Francisco, California	Moscone Center	Jörg Henkel
61st	2024	San Francisco, California	Moscone Center	Vivek De
62nd	2025	San Francisco, California	Moscone Center	Helen Li
63rd	2026	Long Beach, California	Long Beach Convention Center	Renu Mehra
64th†	2027	San Jose, California	San Jose Convention Center	

== Gallery ==
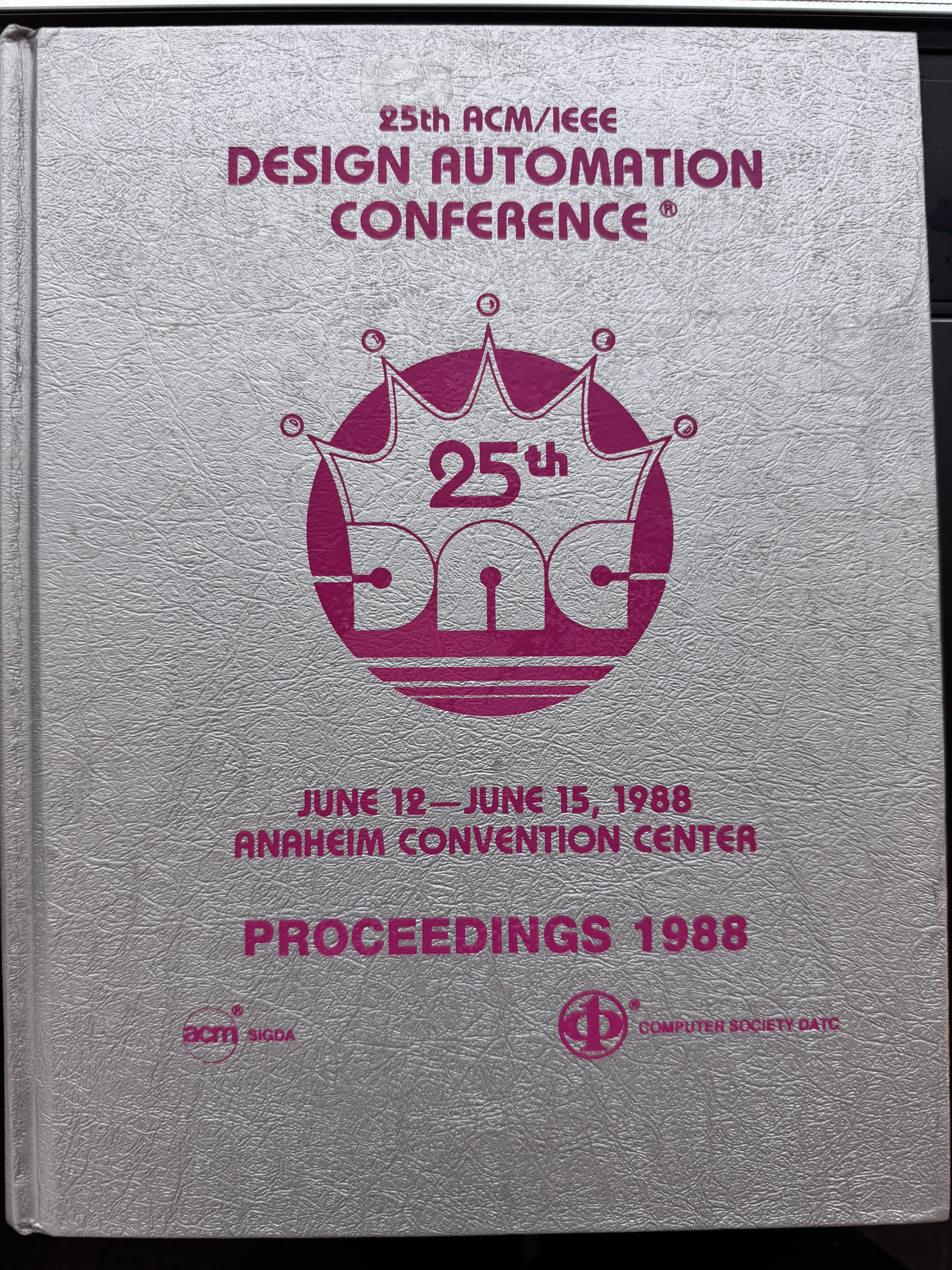
The cover of the 25th DAC Proceedings (1988).

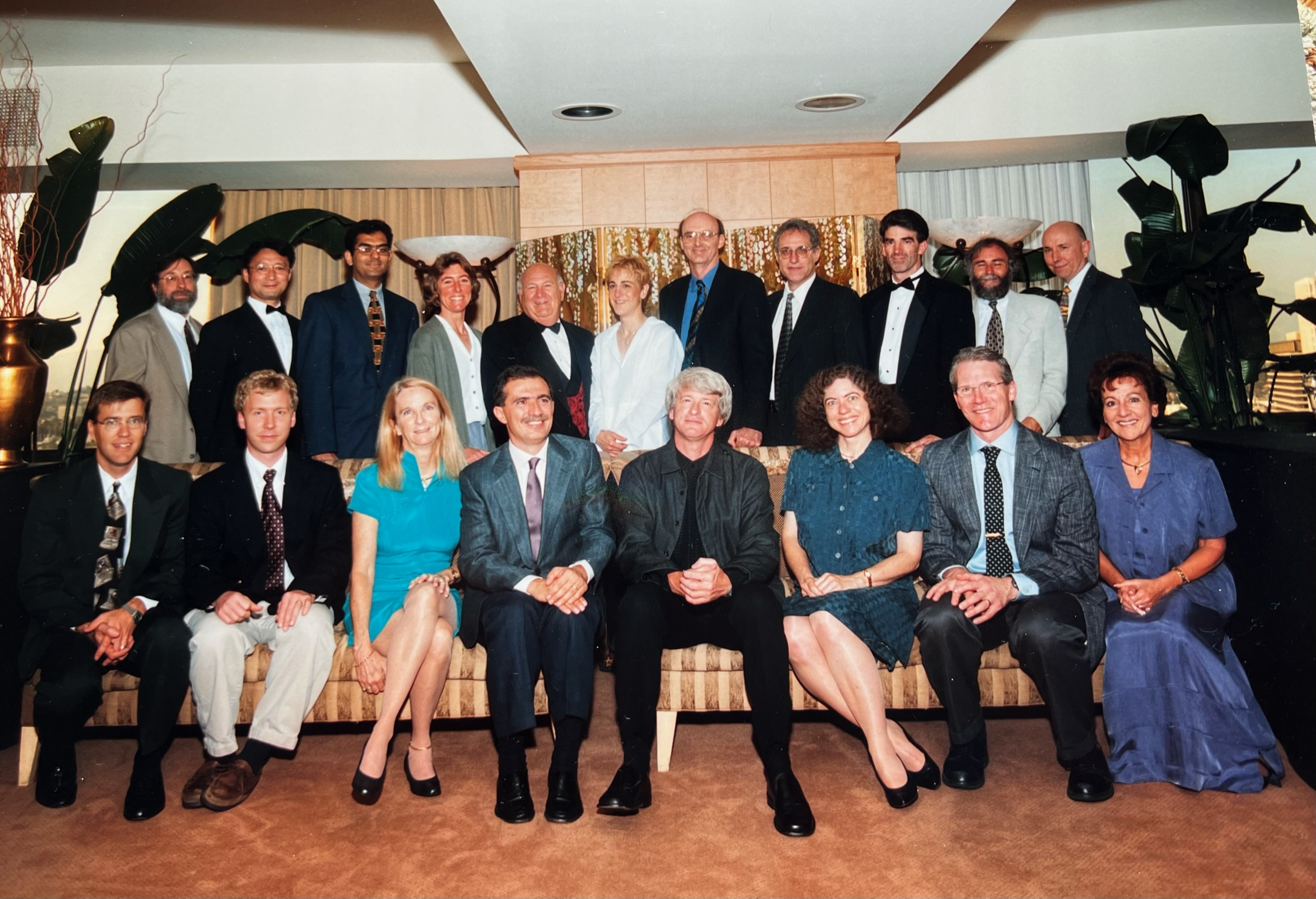
The Executive Committee of the 37th DAC in June 2000. Sitting in the bottom row are Lee Wood, David Blaauw, Mary Jane Irwin, Giovanni De Micheli, Jan Rabaey, Ellen Yoffa, Randal Bryant, and Marie R. Pistilli.

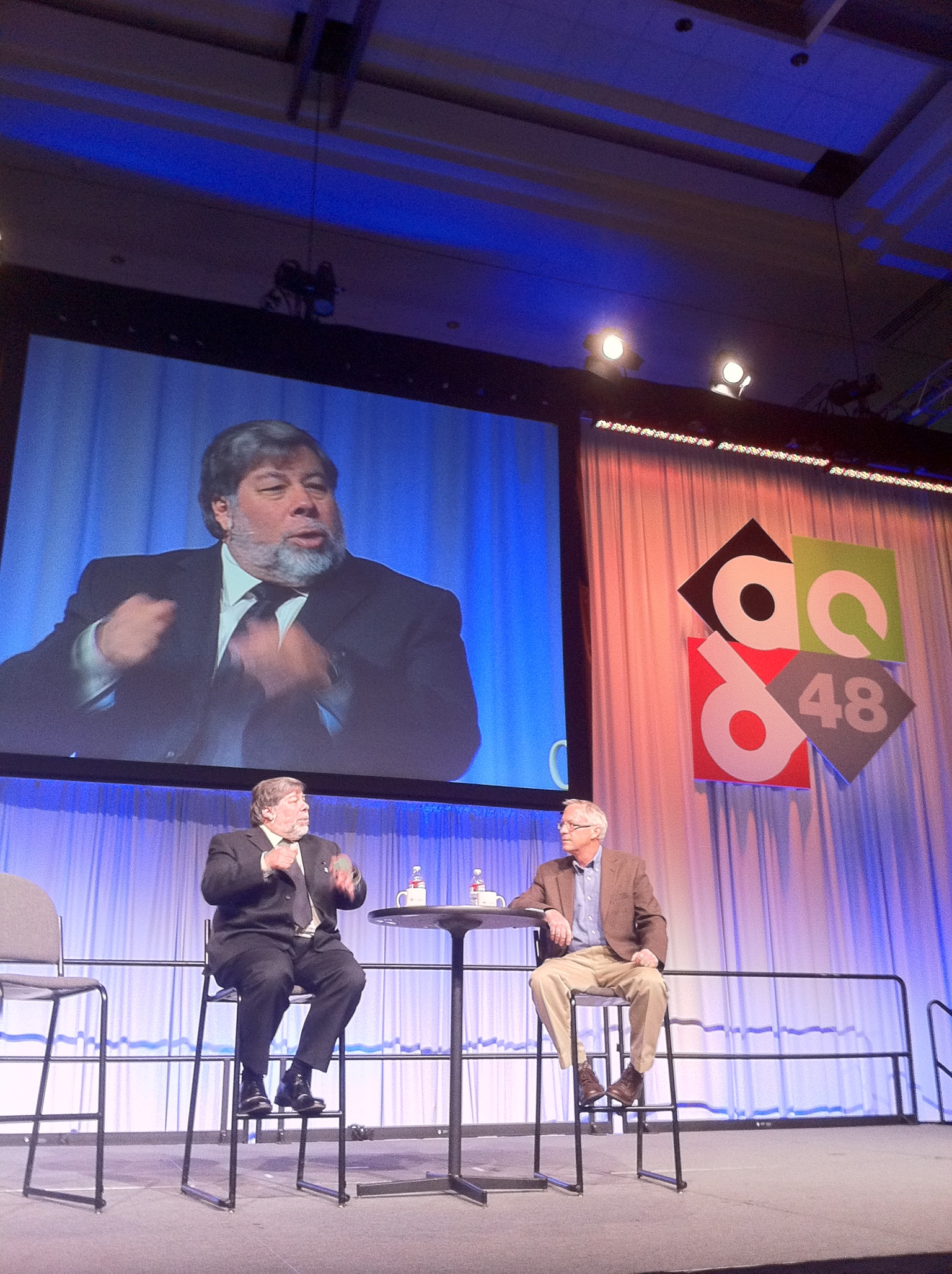
Apple co-founder Steve Wozniak delivered the keynote address at the 48th DAC in 2011.

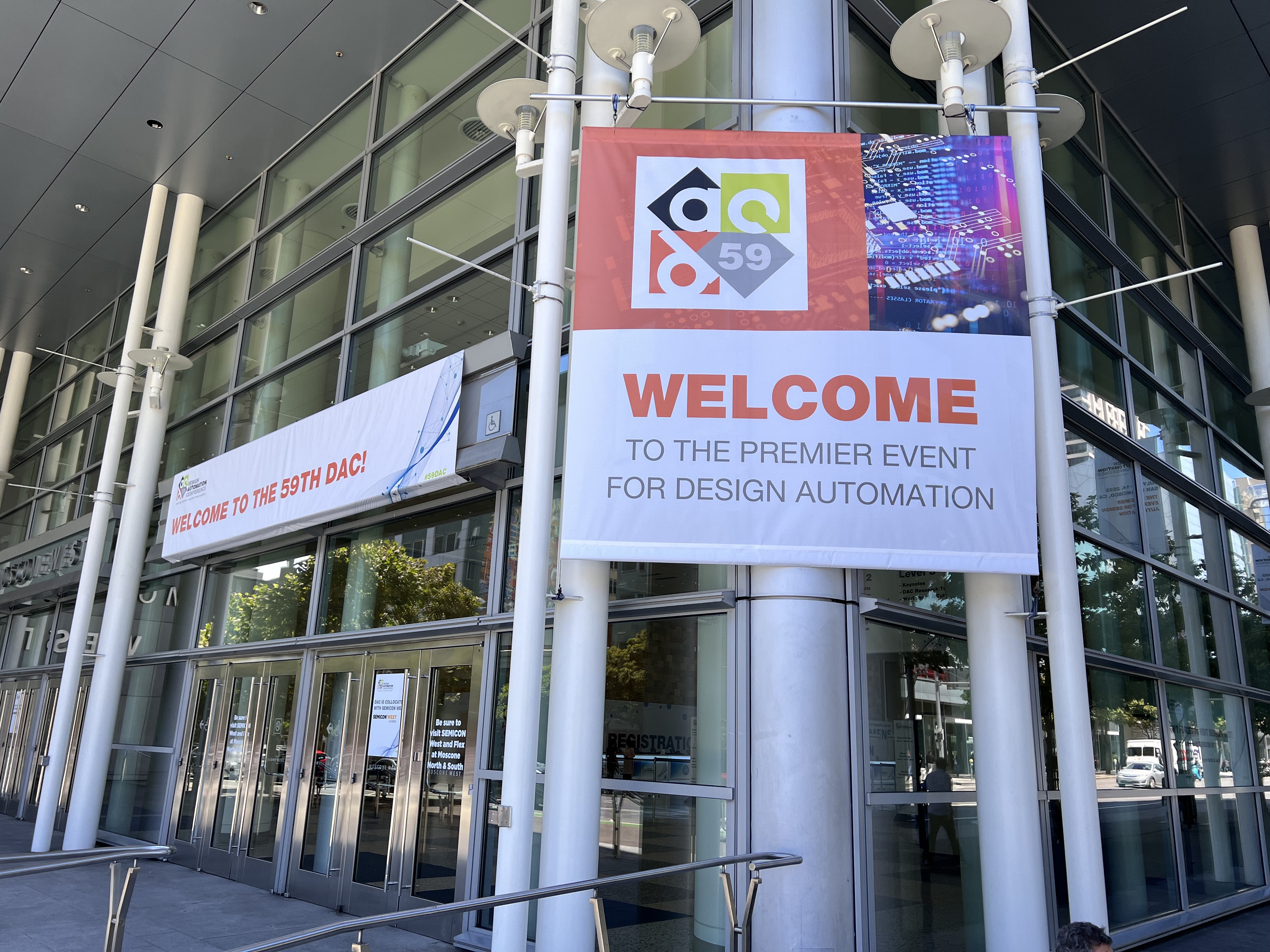
The 59th DAC was at Moscone West, San Francisco, July 2022.

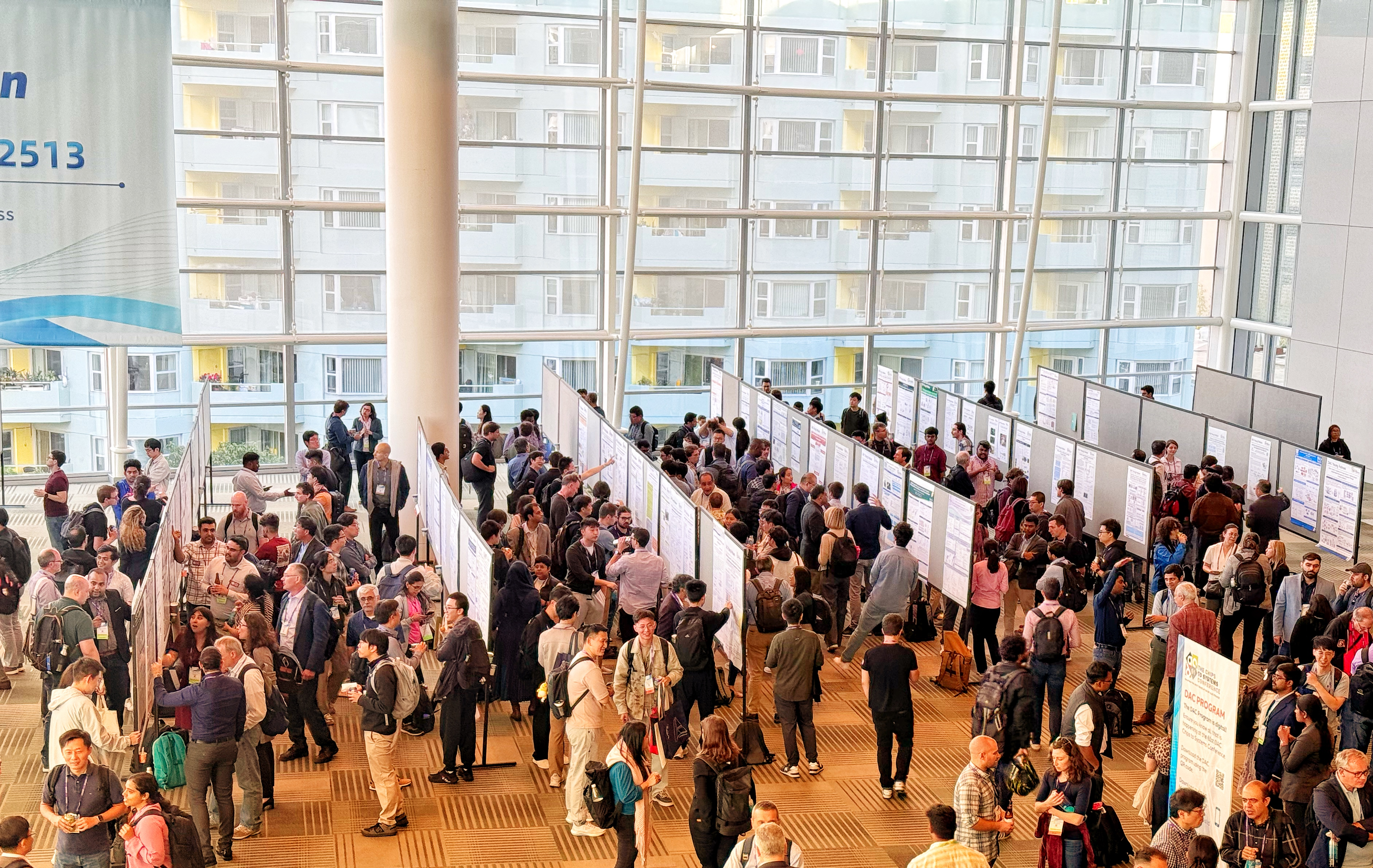
The poster session of the DAC Young Fellows at the 61st DAC in Moscone West, July 2024.

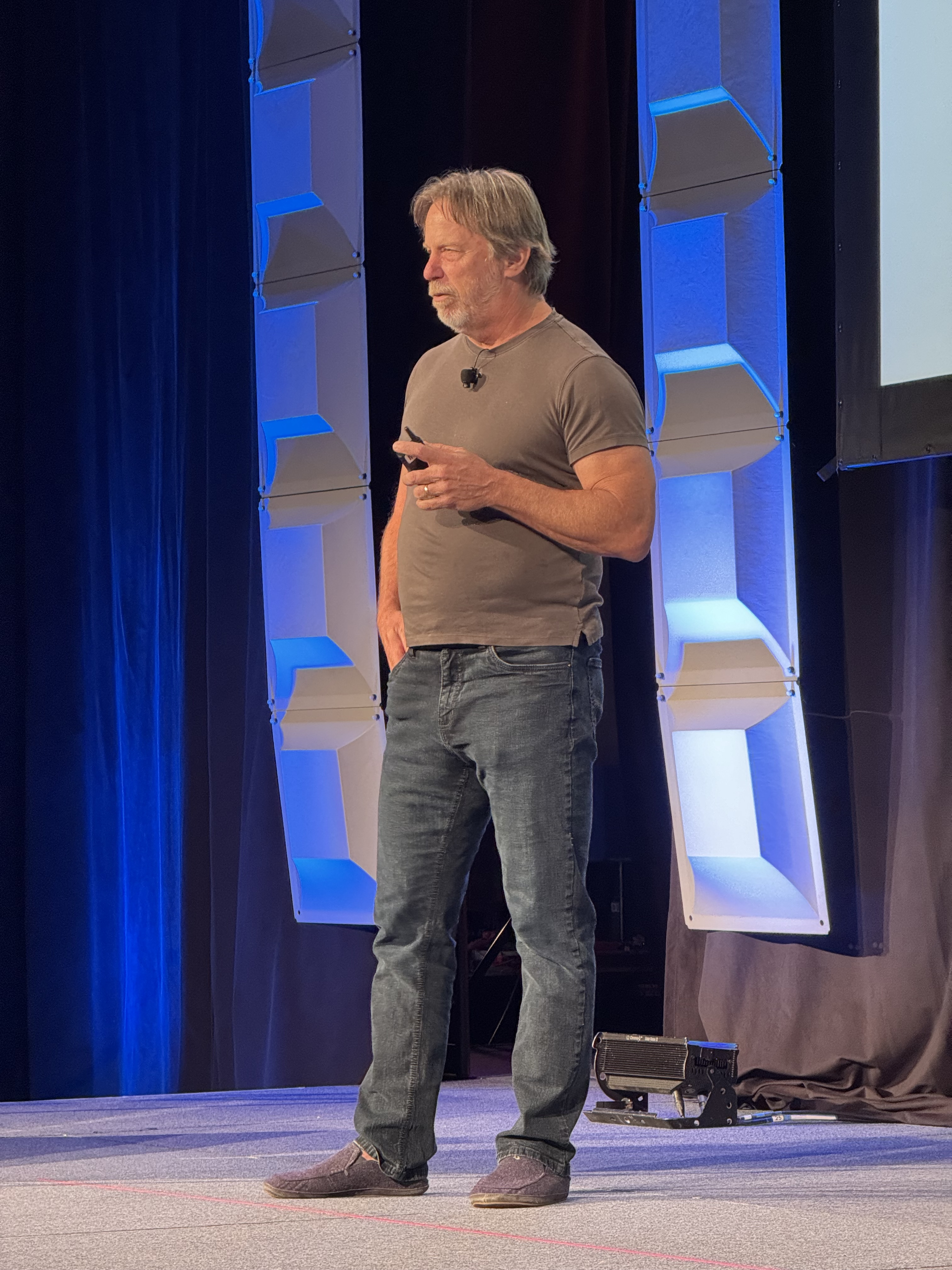
Jim Keller delivering his keynote at the 61st DAC in 2024.

== See also ==
- Marie Pistilli Award, an award for women in Electronic Design Automation issued at DAC
- Phil Kaufman Award, an award for key contributors in the field of EDA issued at DAC
- EDA Software Category
- International Conference on Computer-Aided Design
- Asia and South Pacific Design Automation Conference
- Design Automation and Test in Europe
- Symposia on VLSI Technology and Circuits
