= Yiran Chen =

Computer scientist and engineer

- 陈怡然
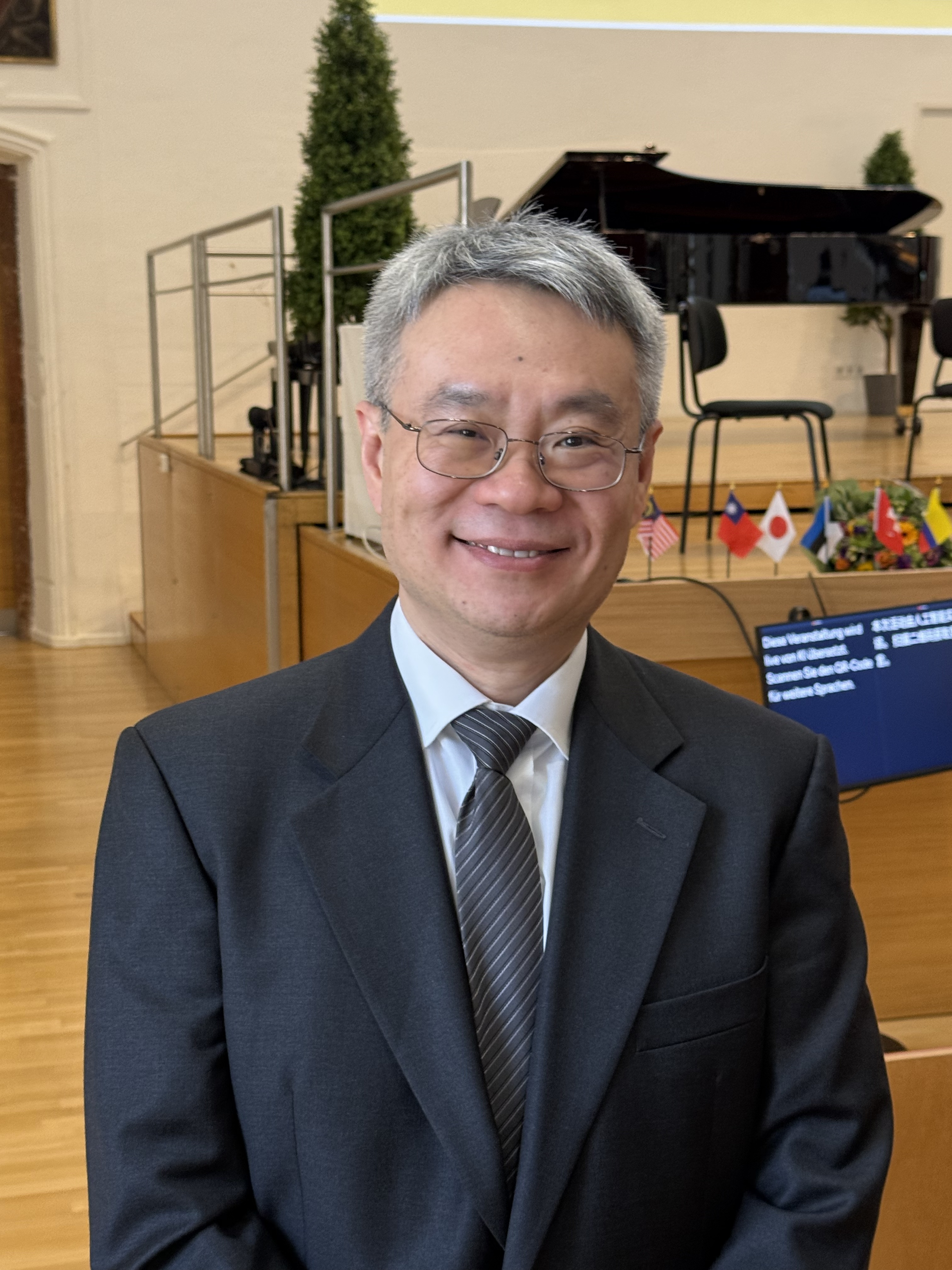
- Yiran Chen's Portrait
- Born: February 29, 1976 (age 50); Zhengzhou, Henan, China
- Education: Tsinghua University (BS, MS); Purdue University (PhD)
- Known for: Spintronic and memristive memory technologies; Neuromorphic computing; Machine learning computing systems; Edge computing
- Spouse: Hai "Helen" Li
- Children: 2
- Awards: IEEE/ACM A. Richard Newton Technical Impact Award in Electronic Design Automation (2026); Member of European Academy of Sciences and Arts (2025); NAI Fellow (2023); AAAS Fellow (2022); ACM Fellow (2020); IEEE Fellow (2018)
- Scientific career
- Theses: Design Techniques for Power Efficiency and Robustness in Scaled High-performance Systems (2005); Research on Dynamic Property and Gain-Clamping of EDFA (2001)
- Doctoral advisor: Kaushik Roy; Cheng-Kok Koh
- Other academic advisors: Chong-Cheng Fan
- Website: ece.duke.edu/people/yiran-chen/

Yiran Chen (Chinese: 陈怡然; pinyin: Chén Yírán; born February 29, 1976) is a Chinese-born American computer scientist and electrical engineer whose research concerns emerging memory technologies, neuromorphic computing, and machine-learning systems. He is the John Cocke Distinguished Professor of Electrical and Computer Engineering at Duke University, where he directs the U.S. National Science Foundation AI Institute for Edge Computing Leveraging Next Generation Networks (Athena) and the Institute of AI Engineering.

== Early life and education ==
Chen was born in Zhengzhou, Henan, China, into a family of middle-school teachers. He entered the Department of Electronic Engineering at Tsinghua University in 1994, was selected for an accelerated "4+2" program, and completed his undergraduate degree in 1998. He received an M.S. from Tsinghua in 2001, advised by Chongcheng Fan, and a Ph.D. from Purdue University in 2005, advised by Kaushik Roy and Cheng-Kok Koh.

== Career and research ==
Chen worked at Synopsys in Silicon Valley from 2005 to 2007, where he developed PrimeTime VX, a statistical static timing analysis tool. In 2007, he and his wife, Hai (Helen) Li, joined Seagate Technology's Advanced Technology Group as circuit designers working on spintronic memory. He joined the University of Pittsburgh as an assistant professor of electrical and computer engineering in 2010 and was promoted to associate professor with tenure in 2014.

Chen moved to Duke University in January 2017 and was named the John Cocke Distinguished Professor in 2023. In 2021, he received a $20 million grant from the National Science Foundation to establish and direct Athena, an NSF AI institute focused on edge computing. In 2026, he became director of Duke's Institute of AI Engineering. With Hai Li and Huanrui Yang, he published the textbook Machine Learning and Neural Networks: A Computer Engineering Perspective (Springer, 2026), and he received the Duke Graduate School's Dean's Award for Excellence in Mentoring in 2024.

At Seagate, Chen led the design of a 16-kilobit spin-transfer torque random-access memory (STT-RAM) test chip and co-authored a 2009 study describing a spintronic memristor, which was covered by IEEE Spectrum. His 2008 paper proposing 3D-stacked magnetic RAM as on-chip memory received the IEEE/ACM A. Richard Newton Technical Impact Award in Electronic Design Automation in 2026.

Two of his group's 2014 papers on neural-network accelerators based on nonvolatile memory received ten-year retrospective influential-paper awards from ASP-DAC (2024) and ICCAD (2023). His 2016 NeurIPS paper introduced structured-sparsity methods for compressing neural networks and was ranked by Paper Digest among the most influential NeurIPS 2016 papers. His work has also received best-paper awards at DATE 2017, KDD 2020, MICRO 2021, ASP-DAC 2023, and the 2024 AAAI Spring Symposium Series, as well as the IEEE Transactions on Computer-Aided Design Donald O. Pederson Best Paper Award. At the 2024 International Conference on Machine Learning, his group presented LaMAGIC, a language-model-based method for generating analog circuit topologies.

Chen co-founded the Duke Center for Computational Evolutionary Intelligence and the NSF Industry–University Cooperative Research Center for Alternative Sustainable and Intelligent Computing. He served as editor-in-chief of IEEE Circuits and Systems Magazine from 2020 to 2023 and became founding editor-in-chief of IEEE Transactions on Circuits and Systems for Artificial Intelligence in 2024. He chaired ACM's Special Interest Group on Design Automation from 2021 to 2024 and the steering committee of the IEEE Non-Volatile Memory Systems and Applications Symposium, and served on a National Academies committee on machine learning in safety-critical applications from 2022 to 2025.

== Awards and honors ==
- 2026: IEEE/ACM A. Richard Newton Technical Impact Award in Electronic Design Automation
- 2025: Member of the European Academy of Sciences and Arts
- 2023: Fellow of the National Academy of Inventors
- 2023: IEEE Circuits and Systems Society Charles A. Desoer Technical Achievement Award
- 2022: Fellow of the American Association for the Advancement of Science
- 2022: IEEE Computer Society Edward J. McCluskey Technical Achievement Award
- 2021: Outstanding Electrical and Computer Engineer Award, Purdue University
- 2020: Fellow of the Association for Computing Machinery
- 2018: Fellow of the Institute of Electrical and Electronics Engineers

== Selected publications ==
- X. Dong, X. Wu, G. Sun, Y. Xie, H. Li, and Y. Chen, "Circuit and Microarchitecture Evaluation of 3D Stacking Magnetic RAM (MRAM) as a Universal Memory Replacement," ACM/IEEE Design Automation Conference, 2008, pp. 554–559.
- X. Wang, Y. Chen, H. Xi, H. Li, and D. V. Dimitrov, "Spintronic Memristor through Spin Torque Induced Magnetization Motion," IEEE Electron Device Letters, vol. 30, no. 3, 2009, pp. 294–297.
- Y. Chen, H. Li, X. Wang, W. Zhu, W. Xu, and T. Zhang, "A 130 nm 1.2V/3.3V 16 Kb Spin-Transfer Torque Random Access Memory with Nondestructive Self-Reference Sensing Scheme," IEEE Journal of Solid-State Circuits, vol. 47, no. 2, 2012, pp. 560–573.
- W. Wen, C. Wu, Y. Wang, Y. Chen, and H. Li, "Learning Structured Sparsity in Deep Neural Networks," Conference on Neural Information Processing Systems, 2016.
- C.-C. Chang, Y. Shen, S. Fan, J. Li, S. Zhang, N. Cao, Y. Chen, and X. Zhang, "LaMAGIC: Language-Model-based Topology Generation for Analog Integrated Circuits," International Conference on Machine Learning, 2024.

== Other activities ==
While at Tsinghua, Chen and several classmates co-founded the Weilan online bookstore (welan.com). His Weibo channel on research and higher education has more than 591,000 followers. He is a founding member of the steering committee of the Academic Alliance on AI Policy and has commented on artificial intelligence in media outlets including Bloomberg, The New York Times, and Reuters.

== Personal life ==
Chen is married to Hai (Helen) Li, the Marie Foote Reel E'46 Distinguished Professor and chair of the Department of Electrical and Computer Engineering at Duke University. They have two sons.
