= Belle Wei =

American electrical engineer

Belle Wei is the first Asian American woman college dean and she focuses on community outreach within this position. Wei addressed House of Representatives Democratic leader, Nancy Pelosi in January of 2006 advocating the importance of real-world gloabl competition for engineering students beyond a school setting.

Belle W. Y. Wei is an American electrical engineer and educator. As of 2020 she is Carolyn Guidry Chair in Engineering Education and Innovative Learning at San José State University.

Her other positions include Charles W. Davidson College of Engineering's Don Beall Dean of Engineering at San José State University and Provost and Vice President for Academic Affairs at California State University, Chico.

Belle Wei received her B.S. in Biophysics from U.C. Berkeley, her M.S. in Engineering from Harvard University, and her Ph.D. in Electrical Engineering and Computer Sciences from U.C. Berkeley.

== Awards and recognition ==
- 2007: Electrical Engineering Times Educator of the Year. for educators exceeding leadership and creativity.
- 2012: Marie Pistilli Award. for her leadership in the promotion of engineering education. A Design Automation Conference press-release quotes Karen Bartleson, senior director of community marketing for Synopsys and chair of Women in Electronic Design saying during the award presentation: "Belle Wei, the first endowed dean at the SJSU College of Engineering, has spearheaded a long term transformation of the college to educate students to become engineers and immediate contributors in a global workplace".
