= Kranen =

Kranen is a surname. Notable people with the surname include:

- Kathryn Kranen (fl. 2003), American electronic design automation engineer and business executive
- Henrique Kranen (1911–1974), Brazilian rower

== See also ==
- Spierings Kranen
