= Penny Herscher =

American executive

Penny Herscher is an American executive in electronic design automation industry, formerly with Cadence Design Systems.

She was Chairman and CEO of Simplex Solutions when the company IPO’d, subsequently acquired by Cadence in 2002

Within Cadence she held positions of executive vice president and general manager of the design and functional verification division.

Penny Herscher holds a BA Hons, MA in mathematics from Cambridge University. She began her career in 1982 as an R&D engineer with Texas Instruments and then Daisy Systems. During 1988 - 1996 she was an employee and senior executive at Synopsys.

== Awards and recognition ==
- 2000: Marie Pistilli Award (the first recipient)

== Modern Health lawsuit ==
Penny Herscher led a special litigation committee investigating allegations of theft, plagiarism, kickbacks and fraud in a derivative suit against Modern Health, a company she sat on the board of. Herscher testified that she had maintained an 18-year family friendship with David Berger, Modern Health’s then–defense attorney from Wilson Sonsini, and that he had introduced her to Watson and helped recruit her to the board. As a result, the judge dismissed the company's motions due to the perceived bias of Herscher and the SLC. It was reported that Herscher mocked the plaintiff’s allegation that Modern Health advertised it had Javanese-speaking therapists when it in fact had no such therapists. “Javanese is not a language,” she said. “That’s what’s so bizarre about this.…Java is a computer language, and there is no such language as Javanese.”
