= Bnext =

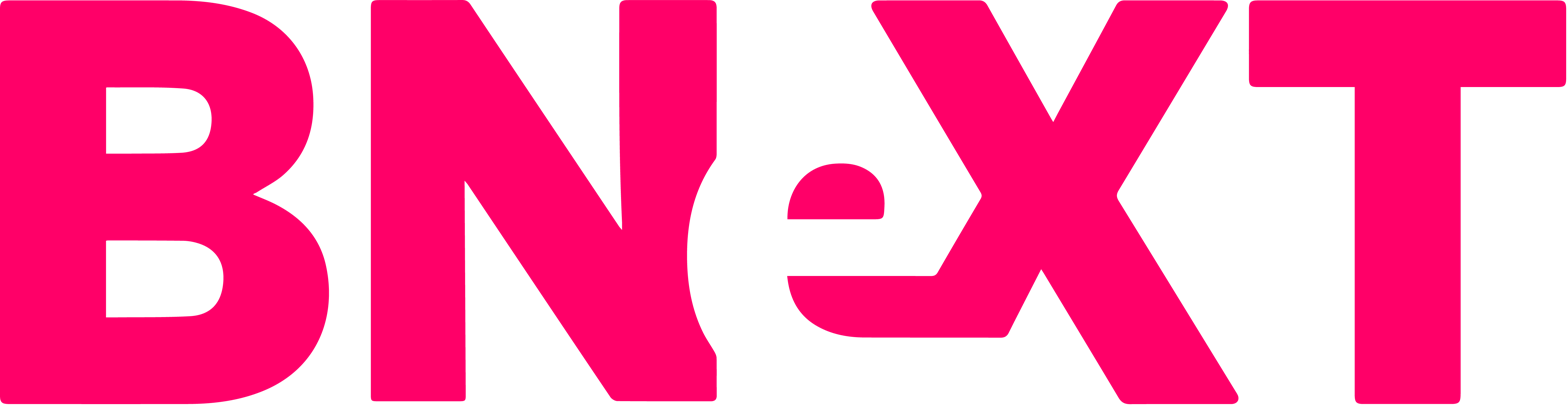
- Company type: Private
- Industry: Financial services
- Founded: 2016; 10 years ago
- Headquarters: Madrid, Spain
- Products: Checking accounts, savings accounts, debit cards, peer to peer payments, fee-free overdraft
- Website: bnext.es

Bnext is a Spanish fintech based in Madrid, Spain. It officially launched on March 30, 2017 and in February 2020 officially became registered as a electronic money institution (EMI) by the Bank of Spain.

== History ==
The company was created by Guillermo Vicandi and Juan Antonio Rullán de la Mata with the initial development of an application in September 2016. In February 2017, it was selected by the Plug and Play Tech Center to make a round of crowdfunding in Crowdcube in which it obtained 300,000 euros to expand.

The structure of Bnext followed the same as other neobanks by not having a banking license and just a e-money license where users could load money into their cards and use it worldwide without any foreign transaction fees. The app also allows users to connect other bank accounts as a way to manage their finances.

== See also ==
- List of banks in Spain
- Digital banking
