= Marie Pistilli Award =

The Marie R. Pistilli Women in Engineering Achievement Award is issued annually since 2000 by the Design Automation Conference (DAC) to honor the outstanding achievements of women in Electronic Design Automation. It is named after the co-founder of DAC, Marie Pistilli. Originally named as the "Marie R. Pistilli Women in EDA Achievement Award", it is named the "Marie R. Pistilli Women in Engineering Achievement Award" since 2016.

== Recipients ==
- 2000: Penny Herscher, then with Cadence Design Systems
- 2001: Deirdre Hanford, Synopsys, Inc.
- 2002: Ann Rincon, then senior technical staff member at IBM Microelectronics, Burlington, Vermont, "For her significant contributions in helping women advance in the field of DA technology"
- 2003: Karen Bartleson, Synopsis, Inc.
- 2004: Mary Jane Irwin, Pennsylvania State University
- 2005: Kathryn Kranen, Jasper Design Automation
- 2006: Ellen J. Yoffa, IBM
- 2007: Jan Willis, then with Cadence Design Systems - "Jan's leadership and dedication in serving as a mentor and role model to women in EDA, and young girls and boys as they begin to consider career options, exemplifies what the Marie R. Pistilli Women in Electronic Design Automation Achievement Award is all about."
- 2008: Louise Trevillyan IBM Research Center
- 2009: Telle Whitney
- 2010: Mar Hershenson, Vice President of Product Development in the Custom Design Business Unit at Magma Design Automation
- 2011: Limor Fix, senior principal engineer and director of academic programs and research at Intel
- 2012: Belle Wei, then Dean of Engineering, San Jose State University
- 2013: Nanette Collins, a public relations consultant from Boston, active in EDA industry
- 2014: Diana Marculescu, Professor of Electrical and Computer Engineering, Carnegie Mellon University
- 2015: Margaret Martonosi, Princeton University
- 2016: Soha Hassoun, Tufts University
- 2017: Janet Olson, then with Synopsys, Inc.
- 2018: Anne Cirkel, Senior Director for Technology Marketing at Mentor, a Siemens Business
- 2019: R. Iris Bahar, Brown University
- 2020: Alessandra Nardi, Cadence Design Systems Software Engineering Group Director
- 2021: Renu Mehra, Vice President Engineering, Synopsys, Inc.
- 2022: Michelle Clancy, President and CEO, Cayenne Global
- 2023: Xiaobo Sharon Hu, Professor in the Department of Computer Science and Engineering, University of Notre Dame

== See also ==
- List of engineering awards
