= Pejman Nozad =

Iranian-American venture capitalist

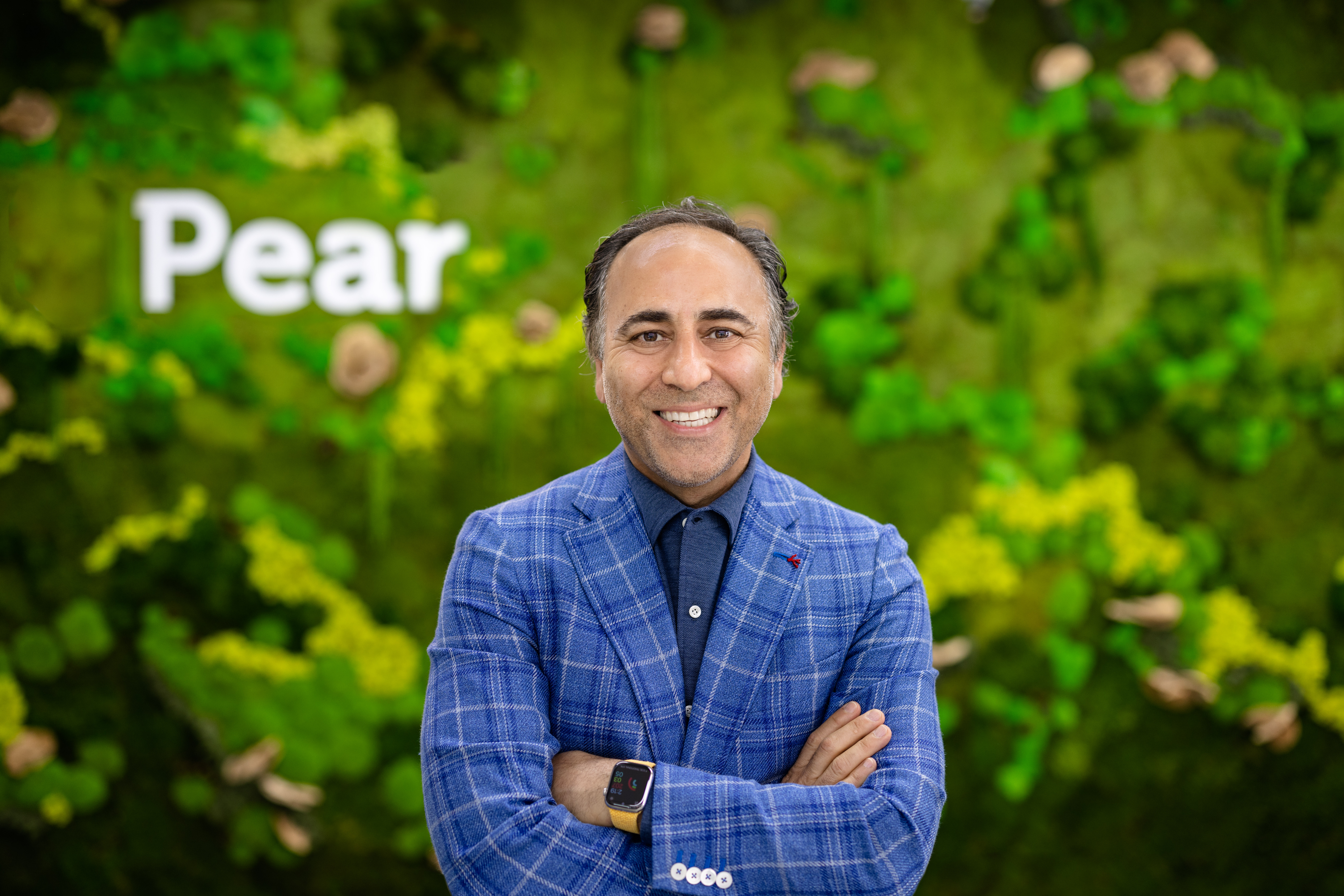
- Occupation: venture capitalist
- Years active: 1999–present

Pejman Nozad is an Iranian-American venture capitalist known for co-founding Pear VC and Amidzad Partners. He is also a former radio host and professional soccer player. He was ranked in the 15th spot in Forbes' annual Midas List in 2021 and also 2022. He was #1 on the seed investors list in 2024.

== Early life and education ==
Nozad grew up during the Iranian Revolution. He attended a German school in Tehran that eventually shut down because of the ongoing conflict. Nozad wrote for a sports column when he was 16 and created and hosted a sports radio talk show when he was 18.

== Career ==
Nozad played soccer professionally in Iran for three years before eventually moving to Germany to play soccer on a scholarship in the 1980s. He immigrated to the United States in 1992. Before taking up investing, Nozad served as a car washer, yogurt shop employee, and rug salesman at the Medallion Rug Gallery.

Nozad founded investment firm Amidzad Partners in 1999 with Rahim and Saeed Amidi, who also own the Medallion Rug Gallery and Plug and Play Tech Center. With Amidzad Partners, Nozad invested in companies such as Qwiki.

He also co-founded venture firm Pear VC with Mar Hershenson under the name Pejman Mar in 2013. Nozad is the firm's founding managing partner.

For his work with Pear VC, he was also ranked in the 15th spot in Forbes' annual Midas List in 2021. In 2022, he retained the number 15 rank in the Midas List and was ranked number 2 on the Midas Seed List.
