= Bartleson =

Bartleson is a surname. Notable people with this surname

- Karen Bartleson, American former executive in electronic design automation industry
- John Bartleson a leader of the Bartleson–Bidwell Party, one of the first emigrant parties
- C. J. Bartelson, a namesake of the Bartleson–Breneman effect in perception of contrast by a human observer
- Charlie Bartleson, early 20th century football player and coach with Florida Gators, see 1908 Florida football team
