= Deirdre Hanford =

American businesswoman

Deirdre Hanford (Deirdre Ryan Hanford) is an American executive in electronic design automation industry. As of 2020 she is Chief Security Officer for Synopsys.

== Education and work ==
Deidre earned a B.S. in electric engineering from Brown University (1983) and a M.S. in electric engineering from UC Berkeley.

She joined Synopsys in 1987, becoming its 8th employee. Since then she advanced via many roles.

In 2008 she was Chairman of the American Electronics Association. She was named founding CEO of Natcast in January 2024. Prior to that, she was an inaugural member of the Industrial Advisory Committee created by the CHIPS Act.

== Awards and recognition ==
- 2001: Marie Pistilli Award - “Deirdre was chosen for this award because of her pioneering leadership and dedicated commitment to serving the design community” (Mar Hershenson, chair of the Workshop for Women in Design Automation)
- 2001: YWCA Tribute to Women and Industry (TWIN) Award
- 1983: Domenoco A. Iolanta Award from Brown University for her senior year team research project

== Personal ==
Deirdre has three sons. She praises Synopsys for the company's supportive attitude towards women. Her first three promotions coincided with her pregnancies. Deidre is quoted as saying, "Synopsys didn't mommy-track me when I started a family".
