= Louise Trevillyan =

American electronics engineer

Louise Trevillyan is an American electronics engineer, research staff member at the Design Automation Department, IBM Thomas J. Watson Research Center.

Trevillyan holds a B.A. and M.A. in mathematics and an M.S. in computer science from the University of Michigan.

== Awards and recognition ==
- 2012: ACM SIGDA Pioneering Achievement Award
  "Recognizing her almost-40-year career in EDA and her groundbreaking research contributions in logic and physical synthesis, design verification, high-level synthesis, processor performance analysis, and compiler technology"
- 2008: Marie Pistilli Award
  "The award honors Trevillyan for her extensive contributions to the field of EDA throughout her lengthy career, as a technologist and leader, and as a notable role model and mentor to others in the field. <...> Throughout her more than 30-year career, Trevillyan has done extensive, groundbreaking research on logic and physical synthesis, design verification, high-level synthesis, processor performance analysis and compiler technology and holds 12 patents in design automation."
- 1996: IEEE Fellow "for her pioneering work in logic synthesis."
