= Spiering =

Spiering is a surname. Notable people with the surname include:

- Henry Spiering (1831–1908), German-American editor and politician
- Louis C. Spiering (1874–1912), American architect; brother of Theodore Spiering
- Rainer Spiering (born 1956), German politician
- Ray and Louise Spiering, plaintiffs in a court case over silent birth
- Theodore Spiering (1871–1925), American violinist, conductor and teacher; brother of Louis C. Spiering

== See also ==
- Stijn Spierings (born 1996), Dutch footballer
- Spierings Kranen, Dutch manufacturer of cranes
