= Kathryn Kranen =

American electronic design automation engineer and business executive

Kathryn Kranen is an American electronic design automation engineer and business executive.

Kathryn Kranen graduated summa cum laude from Texas A&M University with a B.S. in electrical engineering. She started her career as a design engineer at Rockwell International and later joined Daisy Systems.

Her other former positions include Corporate Vice President and General Manager, Formal and Automated Verification Business Unit, Cadence Design Systems (2014) president and CEO of Jasper Design Automation Inc. (since 2003 and until its acquisition by Cadence in 2014), president and CEO of Verisity Design, Inc., vice president of North American Sales at Quickturn Systems.

In 2012, Kranen was elected Chairperson of the Electronic Design Automation Consortium (EDAC), the first woman to hold this position.

In 2014 she announced her retirement from the EDA industry. She explained her decision by her desire to lead a moderately-sized, 200-150 people, company, which, in her opinion, is nearly impossible to find in EDA at these times. The same year she joined the board of directors of a Scottish software company CriticalBlue.

== Awards and recognition ==
- 2013: ACE Lifetime Achievement Award for contributions to Electronics Design
- 2009: Kranen was named one of the EE Times' Top 10 Women in Microelectronics
- 2005: Marie Pistilli Award
