= Anne Cirkel =

Electronic design automation industry executive

- Born: Eschweiler, Germany
- Education: Aachen University
- Occupation: Electronic design automation industry executive
- Employer: Mentor Graphics

Anne Cirkel is an electronic design automation industry executive, who is currently Senior Director for Technology Marketing at Mentor, a Siemens Business.

== Early life and career ==
Annie Cirkel was born in Eschweiler, Germany and earned degrees in metallurgy, economics and business administration from Aachen University.

Her EDA career started with a position at Viewlogic in their field office in Munich, Germany (Viewlogic was acquired by Synopsys in 1997.) In 1999, she moved to Portland, Oregon, to work for Analogy (now part of Synopsys) and the same year she was offered a job at Mentor's Wilsonville, Oregon headquarters.

Cirkel served as general chair of the 2015 Design Automation Conference.

== Awards ==
- 2018: Marie Pistilli Award
- IEEE EDA Outstanding Service Award
