= Pear VC =

Seed-stage venture firm

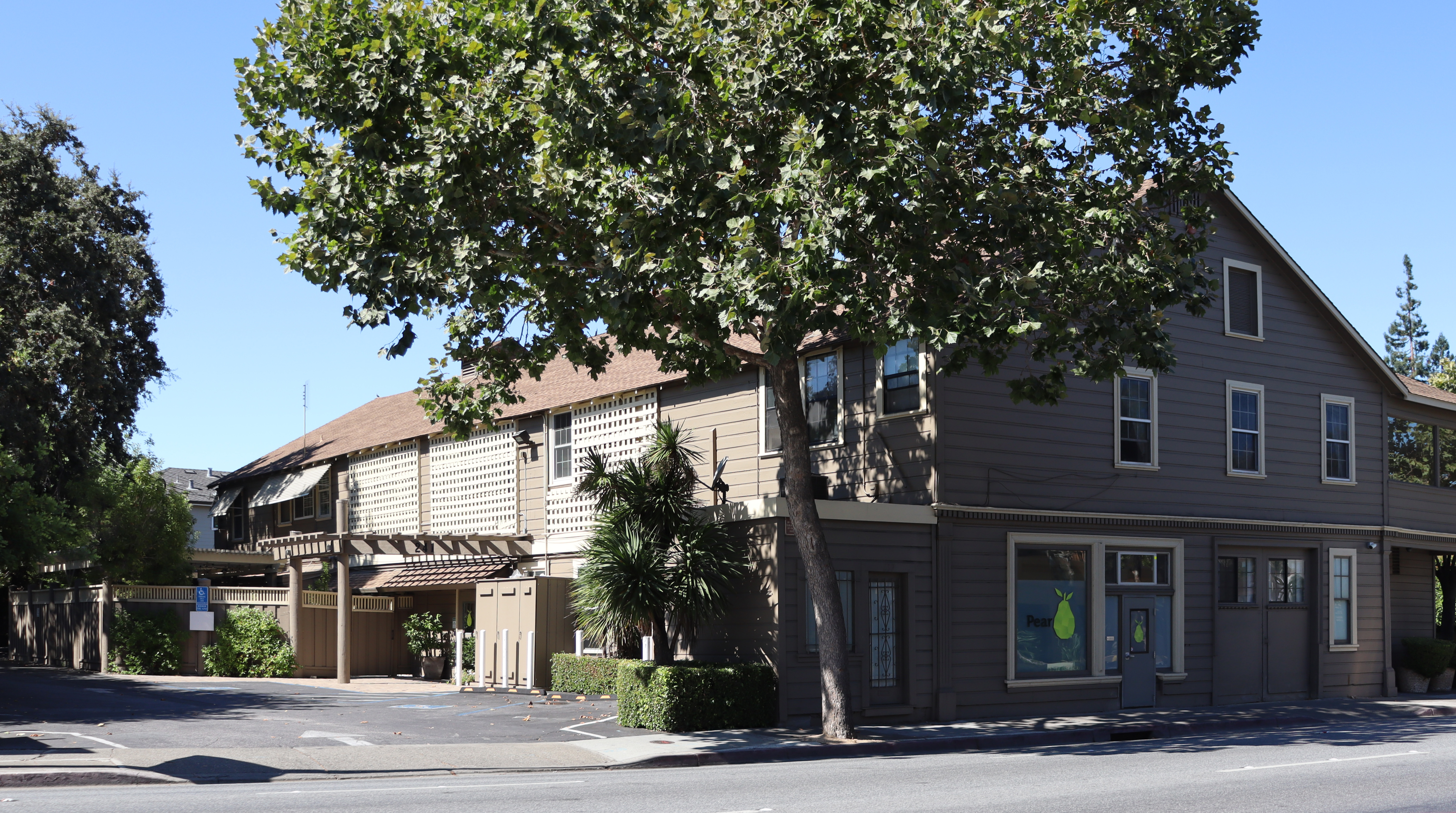
- Headquarters in Menlo Park
- Formerly: Pejman Mar
- Type: Private
- Industry: Financial, Venture Capital, startup accelerator
- Founded: 2013; 13 years ago
- Founder: Pejman Nozad, Mar Hershenson
- Headquarters: Menlo Park, California, USA
- Key people: Pejman Nozad, Mar Hershenson
- AUM: US$800 million (2023)
- Website: www.pear.vc

Pear VC (prior name Pejman Mar) is a seed-stage venture firm based in Menlo Park, California. It was founded by Pejman Nozad and Mar Hershenson in 2013. Pear VC works with early-stage companies. The company was based in Palo Alto, California before relocating to Menlo Park. It had approximately US$800 million in assets under management as of 2023.

== History ==
The company launched under the name Pejman Mar Ventures, in 2013. Pear VC was founded by Pejman Nozad and Mar Hershenson, and features both a venture investing arm and an accelerator launched in 2014. By 2021, the accelerator had overseen 80 companies through the program.

Prior to founding the company, Hershenson founded software companies Barcelona Design, Sabio Labs, and Revel Touch. Nozad had served as a sports journalist, radio host, professional soccer player, and rug salesman before going into venture capital.

In 2015, Pejman Mar sponsored a $250,000 startup competition at UC Berkeley. Over time, the company also sponsored fellowship and entrepreneurship programs under the name “Pear Dorm” at Stanford University, Harvard University, and MIT.

Pejman Mar rebranded as Pear VC in 2016. Pear VC was one of the companies backing DoorDash prior to its launch. Other companies Pear VC has supported include Guardant Health, Gusto, Polarr and Branch.

For their work with Pear VC, Hershenson was ranked number 29 and Nozad was ranked 15 on Forbes’ 2021 Midas List. The following year, Nozad was named number 2 on Forbes’ 2022 Midas Seed List and number 15 on the regular Midas List, while Hershenson was ranked number 30 on the Midas List.

In 2022, Matt Birnbaum, former head of talent acquisition at Instacart, joined Pear VC as its head of talent.

On the 10th of March, 2023, CNBC reported that Pear VC had urged its portfolio companies to withdraw funds from Silicon Valley Bank before SVB had collapsed.

Pear raised $423m for a seed venture fund in 2023, and had also invested in Guardant Health and Gusto at the two company's inceptions. It targeted pre-seed and seed investments in artificial intelligence. It closed its largest fund at that point in May 2023, with investors in previous funds including the Inasmuch Foundation, Los Angeles Fire & Police Pension System, the Richard King Mellon Foundation, and the Passport Foundation.

== Investment model ==
Pear VC mainly works with startups in their earliest stages, such as pre-seed and seed-stage companies. Pear VC uses a two-pronged structure in which it houses both a venture investing arm and an accelerator.
