= Polarr =

Editing software startup in San Jose

Polarr, Inc
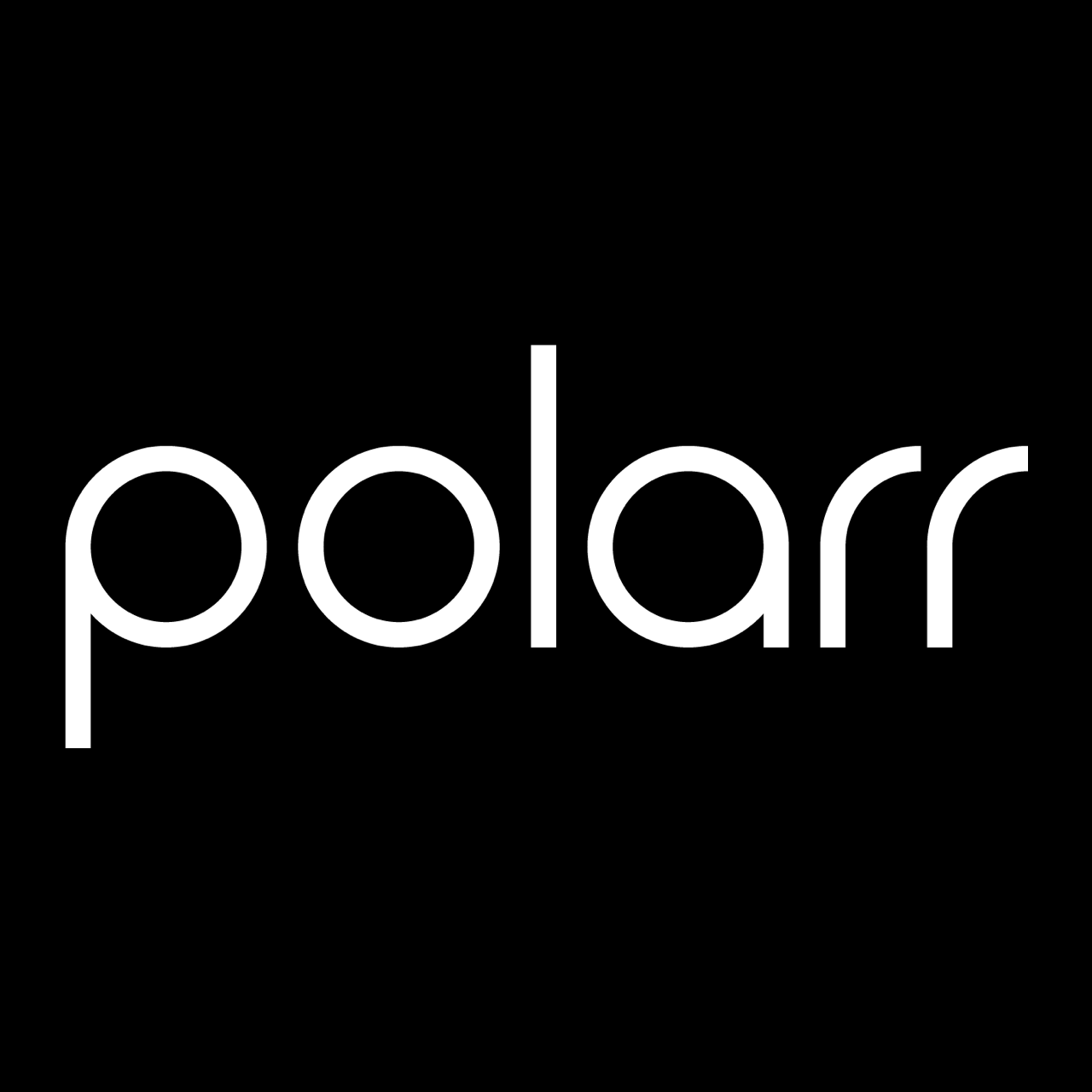
- Company type: Private
- Available in: English
- Founded: August 2014
- Headquarters: United States
- No. of locations: San Jose, CA
- Key people: Borui Wang, Derek Yan
- Industry: Video processing, Image processing, Artificial intelligence
- Products: Polarr, Polarr 24FPS, Polarr SDKs
- Website: www.polarr.com
- Current status: active

Polarr is a startup headquartered in San Jose, California, that offers applications to allow creators to make and distribute photos and video filters. Its products include mobile apps for creators to create and search for image filters, as well web-based products to edit photos.

Polarr is venture-backed and invested in by Threshold.vc, Cota Capital, Pear VC, StartX and ZhenFund.

== History ==
In February 2015, Polarr launched an online photo editor.

In June 2015, the first mobile version of Polarr Photo Editor was released.

In the fall of 2015, Polarr released Polarr Photo Editors for Windows 10 and macOS.

In December 2017, Polarr launched Album+, an app that organizes photos using on-device A.I.

In March 2019, Polarr announced a $11.5 million Series A led by Threshold Ventures.

In April 2022, Polarr launched the Polarr 24FPS app in which Polarr filters can be used on video.

In January 2023, Polarr launched Polarr Next, an AI web app that learns the user's style to update photos automatically.
