= Ann Rincon =

American electronic design automation engineer

Ann Rincon is an American electronic design automation engineer.

During 1981–2002 she was with the IBM. Her positions there included senior technical staff member IBM Microelectronics, Burlington, Vermont. During 2002-2009 she was Senior Scientist at ON Semiconductor. During 2009–2012 she was Senior Staff Engineer and VP at Standard Microsystems Corporation.

Rincon is a recognized expert on ASIC design. She led the development of IBM's system-on-chip design methodology.

She holds a B.S. degree in mathematics and computer science from St. Joseph's College in Rensselaer, Indiana.

She is among the authors of the Wiley Encyclopedia of Electrical and Electronics Engineering.

== Awards and recognition ==
- 2003: Marie Pistilli Award "For her significant contributions in helping women advance in the field of DA technology" Chris King, a former IBM Microelectronics executive and CEO of AMI Semiconductor, nominated Rincon and said: "Ann Rincon has achieved pioneering accomplishments in the design community, while balancing her professional career, family, and self. "
