= 165 University Avenue =

Office building in Palo Alto, California

Coordinates: 37.4444°N 122.1631°W

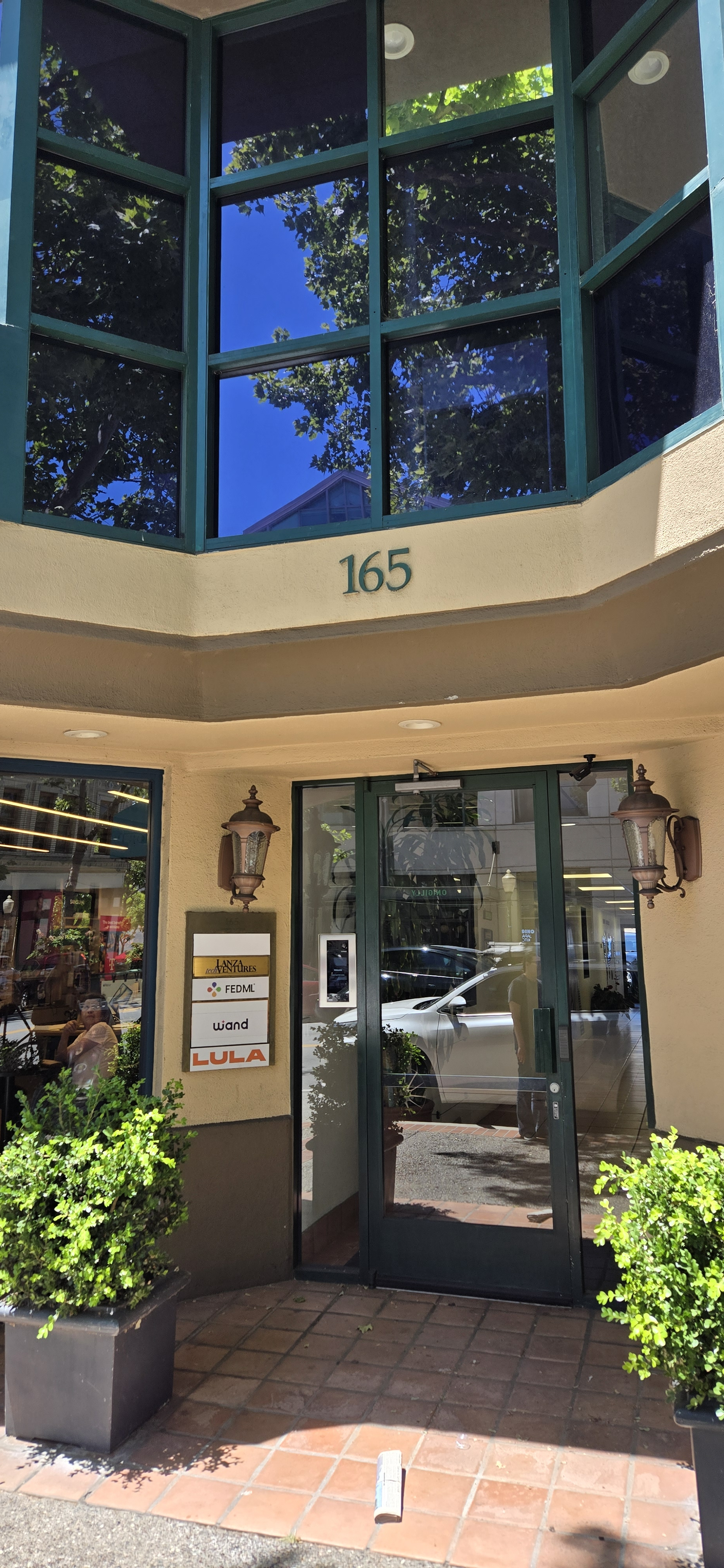
Entrance to 165 University Avenue in 2026

165 University Avenue or Lucky Building or Karma Building is a small rented office building on University Avenue, the main commercial street in downtown Palo Alto, California, that gave rise to Plug and Play Tech Center and to the Amidi Group. It is run by Rahim & Saeed Amidi, whose family fled from the Iranian revolution in the 1970s. Located near Stanford University, the building has served as an incubator for several noted Silicon Valley companies, including Logitech, Google, PayPal, Danger, Inc (bought by Microsoft), BridgeBio Pharma, BetterWorks, Milo.com (bought by eBay), WePay (acquired by J.P. Morgan) and Yummly (bought by Whirlpool). YouTube also provides this location as the example address when setting the location of an uploaded video. Until 2000, the ground floor was home to a Palo Alto institution, Chimaera Books & Music. Like many independent bookstores, its closure was due, in part, to competition from the dot com economy.
