= Sharad Malik =

Indian-American computer scientist

Sharad Malik is an Indian-American computer scientist working in formal methods, electronic design automation, and computer architecture. He is currently the George Van Ness Lothrop Professor of Engineering in the Electrical and Computer Engineering Department at Princeton University.

== Early life and education ==
Malik received his B. Tech in Electrical Engineering from IIT Delhi in 1985, and M. S. and Ph. D. degrees in Computer Science from University of California, Berkeley in 1987 and 1990. His doctoral advisor was Robert K. Brayton.

== Contributions ==
Malik is best known for his contributions to fast solvers for boolean satisfiability (SAT) solving. The Chaff solver built by he and his students ushered in a new era for conflict-driven clause learning-based boolean satisfiability solvers. He also pioneered the Instruction Level Abstraction (ILA) effort for hardware verification.

== Awards ==
- ACM Fellow, 2014
- IEEE Fellow, 2002
- CAV Award, Computer Aided Verification conference, "for fundamental contributions to the development of high-performance Boolean satisfiability solvers", 2009.
- IEEE/ACM International Conference on Computer-Aided Design, Ten Year Retrospective Most Influential Paper Award, 2011
- IEEE/ACM Design Automation Conference 50th Anniversary Most Cited Paper Award, 2013
- Princeton University President’s Award for Distinguished Teaching, 2009
- IEEE CEDA A. Richard Newton Technical Impact Award in Electronic Design Automation, 2017

== Service ==
Malik has served on the editorial boards of journals such as IEEE Transactions on Computer-Aided Design of Integrated Circuits and Systems, IEEE Transactions on VLSI Systems, ACM Transactions on Design Automation of Electronic Systems, Formal Methods in System Design, and Journal of VLSI Signal Processing. He also served as the department chair of Princeton University's ECE department from 2012 to 2021.
