= Soha Hassoun =

American computer scientist

- Education: South Dakota State University (BSEE) Massachusetts Institute of Technology (MS) University of Washington (PhD)
- Scientific career
- Fields: Machine learning and systems biology
- Workplaces: Tufts University
- Website: https://www.cs.tufts.edu/~soha/

Soha Hassoun is American computer scientist. She is Professor (since 2015) and Past Chair (2013–2016) of the Department of Computer Science at Tufts University. Hassoun's interests lie at the intersection of machine learning and systems biology.

== Biography ==
Hassoun earned her BSEE degree from the South Dakota State University (1986), MS from the Massachusetts Institute of Technology (1988), and PhD from the Department of Computer Science and Engineering, University of Washington (1997).

In 1988–1991 Hassoun was an integrated circuit designer with the Microprocessor Design Group, Digital Equipment Corporation. She worked as consultant for IKOS Systems (later part of Mentor Graphics) (1999–2001) and some other EDA companies. Since 1998 she has been with Tufts University.

== Awards and recognition ==
- 2016: Marie R. Pistilli Women in Engineering Achievement Award
- 2015: IEEE CEDA (Council on Electronic Design Automation) Distinguished Service Award for chairing the Design Automation Conference
- 2000, 2007: ACM/SIGDA Distinguished Service Award
- 2002: ACM/SIGDA Technical Leadership Award
- Senior member of IEEE (2007) and ACM
- 2001–2006: NSF CAREER Award
