= Robert K. Brayton =

American electrical engineer (1933–2025)

Robert King Brayton
- Born: October 23, 1933; Ames, Iowa, U.S.
- Died: January 10, 2025 (aged 91); Berkeley, California, U.S.
- Education: Iowa State University (BSEE), Massachusetts Institute of Technology (Ph.D.)
- Known for: Logic synthesis, formal verification, circuit simulation
- Spouse: Ruth B. Brayton
- Children: 3
- Awards: ACM Paris Kanellakis Award, IEEE Emanuel R. Piore Award, IEEE CAS Technical Achievement Award, EDAA Lifetime Achievement Award, Phil Kaufman Award, National Academy of Engineering, IEEE Fellow, AAAS Fellow
- Scientific career
- Fields: Electrical engineering, computer science
- Workplaces: IBM T. J. Watson Research Center, University of California, Berkeley
- Doctoral advisor: Norman Levinson
- Notable students: Sharad Malik
- Website: www2.eecs.berkeley.edu/Faculty/Homepages/brayton.html

Robert K. Brayton (October 23, 1933 – January 10, 2025) was an American electrical engineer, mathematician, and professor emeritus in the Department of Electrical Engineering and Computer Sciences at the University of California, Berkeley. He worked in logic synthesis, formal verification, and electronic design automation (EDA), with a career spanning over six decades.

== Early life and education ==
Brayton was born in Ames, Iowa, and grew up in an academic environment; his father was a high school teacher. He graduated with a Bachelor of Science in Electrical Engineering (BSEE) from Iowa State University in 1956. After a brief period working for Sperry on ICBM computer development and fulfilling his ROTC commitment, he pursued graduate studies at the Massachusetts Institute of Technology (MIT), earning his Ph.D. in mathematics in 1961. While at MIT, he contributed to John McCarthy’s Artificial Intelligence project and worked on the first LISP compiler.

== Career ==
Brayton began his professional career at IBM's T. J. Watson Research Center in Yorktown Heights, New York, where he spent 26 years (1961–1987) in the Mathematical Sciences Department. There, he led the Yorktown Silicon Compiler team and co-developed the sparse tableau methodology, which became foundational in circuit simulation. Brayton’s early work on circuit simulation and logic representation contributed to the evolution of design automation tools.

In 1987, Brayton joined the University of California, Berkeley, as a professor in the EECS department. He became the Cadence Distinguished Professor of Electrical Engineering and held the Edgar L. and Harold H. Buttner Endowed Chair. At Berkeley, he worked in advanced combinational and sequential logic synthesis, formal verification, and multi-level logic minimization. His group played a role in the development of the Multi-level Logic Synthesis System and tools such as the Espresso logic minimizer, which helped circuit design and verification.

== Research and contributions ==
Brayton’s research spanned a wide range of topics, including nonlinear network analysis, circuit simulation, logic synthesis, and formal verification. He authored over 450 technical papers and 10 books. He contributed to logic synthesis, particularly the development and practical realization of algorithms and tools.

== Awards and honors ==
Throughout his career Brayton received awards and recognitions:

- ACM Paris Kanellakis Theory and Practice Award (2006)
- IEEE CAS Technical Achievement Award (1991)
- IEEE CAS Guilleman-Cauer Award (1971)
- ISCAS Darlington Award (1987)
- IEEE CAS Golden Jubilee Award and IEEE Millennium Medal (2000)
- Iowa State University Marston Medal (2002)
- IEEE Emanuel R. Piore Award (2006)
- EDAA Lifetime Achievement Award (2006)
- Phil Kaufman Award (2007)
- SIGDA/CEDA A. Richard Newton Technical Impact Award (2009)
- Fellow of the IEEE and the American Association for the Advancement of Science (AAAS)
- Member of the National Academy of Engineering

== Selected publications ==
- G. D. Hachtel, R. K. Brayton, Logic Synthesis and Verification Algorithms, Kluwer Academic Publishers, 1995.
- R. K. Brayton, R. Spence, Sensitivity and Optimization, Computer-Aided Design of Electronic Circuits, Elsevier Scientific, 1980.
- K. Aadithya, S. Ray, P. Nuzzo, A. Mishchenko, R. K. Brayton, and J. Roychowdhury, “ABCD-NL: Approximating Continuous Non-Linear Dynamical Systems using Purely Boolean Models for Analog/Mixed-Signal Verification,” in Proc. IEEE Asia South-Pacific Design Automation Conference, 2014.

== Personal life ==
Brayton was married to Ruth B. Brayton with three children: Jane Burchard, Jim Brayton, and Michael Brayton. Robert K. Brayton died in Berkeley, California, on January 10, 2025, at the age of 91.

== See also ==
- Logic synthesis
- Formal verification
- Electronic design automation
- List of members of the National Academy of Engineering (Electronics)
