= Limor Fix =

Israeli electronic design automation engineer

- לימור פיקס
- Education: Technion – Israel Institute of Technology, Cornell University
- Known for: Formal verification languages, ForSpec
- Awards: Marie Pistilli Award (2011)
- Scientific career
- Fields: Electronic Design Automation
- Workplaces: Intel

Limor Fix (Hebrew: לימור פיקס) is an Israeli electronic design automation engineer and executive, senior principal engineer and director of academic programs and research at Intel. Her research interests include formal verification languages.

She has Ph.D in computer science from Technion. After that she did post-doc research at the Cornell University. In 1994 she joined Intel in Israel. Limor led the development of a new formal specification language, ForSpec, later donated by Intel to Accellera/IEEE. ForSpec influenced the IEEE 1850-Property Specification Language standard.

She is among the authors of the Electronic Design Automation for Integrated Circuits handbook.

== Awards and recognition ==
- 2011: Marie Pistilli Award "... recognizes Dr. Fix's lengthy set of contributions to EDA, including the development of the ForSpec formal specification language, donated by Intel to Accellera and an important factor in the IEEE-1850 standard, and her work in the areas of SAT solvers and model checking for both hardware and distributed software systems".
