= Plug and Play Tech Center =

American venture capital firm

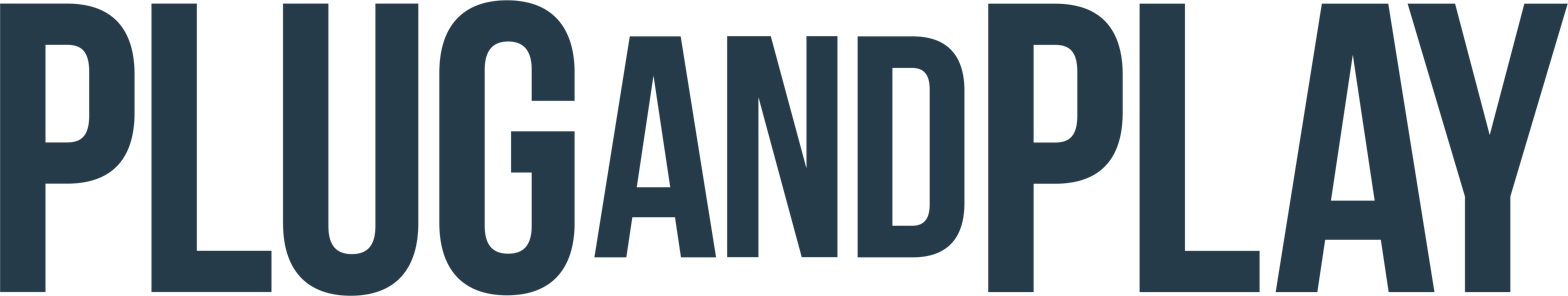
- Type: Private
- Industry: Venture capital
- Founded: 2006; 20 years ago
- Founder: Saeed Amidi
- Headquarters: Sunnyvale, California, U.S.
- Key people: Saeed Amidi (CEO)
- AUM: US$500 million (2023)
- Website: www.plugandplaytechcenter.com

Plug and Play Tech Center (PNP) is an American venture capital firm and startup accelerator headquartered in Sunnyvale, California. It focuses on deploying capital to early-stage technology companies. According to CB Insights from 2020 to 2022, it was the most active startup accelerator in the world with an average deal count of 929 per year, followed by Y Combinator and Techstars.

== History ==
Founder Saeed Amidi came from a family of Iranian immigrants who came to the U.S. in 1979 to escape the Iranian Revolution and established the Amidi Group, a manufacturing business which also had real estate holdings. In 1988, it acquired 165 University Avenue, a small office building in Palo Alto, California used to rent out spaces for companies. During the Dot-com bubble, Amidi and his business partner, Pejman Nozad invested in some of the tenants in 165 University Avenue during their early stages. These included Google, PayPal, Logitech and Danger which gave Amidi multimillion-dollar payouts. Returns and capital gains from these early equity investments provided the seed capital used to formalize Plug and Play's accelerator platform.

In 2006, Amidi used the returns from his investments to fund the Plug and Play Tech Center in Sunnyvale, California. It was based in a three-story 150,000-square-foot building that would rent space and provide other amenities such as gyms and cafeterias to startup companies. It would also provide them with ready access to data centers and telecommunications infrastructure. Amidi and Nozad would use their positions as landlords to look at their tenants before deciding which ones to invest in. Plug and Play would also host events for entrepreneurs to meet. In September 2007, it housed 108 companies.

As global early-stage deal volume expanded, the organization shifted from a real estate-oriented incubator model into an institutional venture capital and accelerator network. From 2020 to 2022, 41% of the firm's investments were in the U.S., 30% in Europe and 17% in Asia. Outside the U.S., Plug and Play has expanded to various regions where it has set up local offices. In 2017, it partnered with Mitsubishi UFJ Financial Group to open an office in Tokyo to invest in Japanese ventures. In June 2023, it was in talks with Jada under the Public Investment Fund to raise $100 million to invest in Saudi Arabia technology startups.

== Notable investments ==
Notable companies that Plug and Play invested in include PayPal, Honey, Logitech, LendingClub and Dropbox.
