= Hai Li =

Chinese-American electrical and computer engineer

Hai (Helen) Li is a Chinese-American electrical and computer engineer known for her research on neuromorphic engineering, the development of computation systems based on physical artificial neurons, and on deep learning, techniques for using deep neural networks in machine learning. She is Marie Foote Reel E’46 Distinguished Professor at Duke University.

== Education and career ==
Li earned both a bachelor's degree and a master's degree from Tsinghua University, in 1998 and 2000 respectively. She completed her Ph.D. at Purdue University in 2004.

She worked in industry at Qualcomm, Intel, and Seagate Technology on computer memory technology including static random-access memory, memristors, and spintronicss, before returning to academia in 2009 with a position at the New York University Tandon School of Engineering, then known as the Polytechnic Institute of New York University. She moved from there to the University of Pittsburgh in 2012, and then to Duke University in 2017, becoming Clare Boothe Luce Associate Professor before her promotion to full professor. In 2025 she was named as the Marie Foote Reel E’46 Distinguished Professor.

Li served as general chair of the 2025 Design Automation Conference.

== Recognition ==
Li was named an IEEE Fellow in 2018, "for contributions to neuromorphic computing systems". She was elected as a 2021 ACM Fellow "for contributions to neuromorphic computing and deep-learning acceleration".
