= Ellen Yoffa =

American physicist and technical executive

Ellen J. Yoffa is an American physicist and technical executive associated with the IBM Thomas J. Watson Research Center.

She held various positions, including director of Next Generation Web at IBM's T.J. Watson Research Center, director of Emerging System Technologies at IBM, director of Personal & Visual Systems at the T.J. Watson Research Center, manager of the Electronic Design Automation Business Strategy organization at the IBM’s Microelectronics Division, technical assistant to the director of the IBM Research Division.

Yoffa received a B. S. and a Ph.D. in Physics at the Massachusetts Institute of Technology. In late 1970s she did her post-doc at the IBM on laser-ionization and heating effects.

Yoffa served as president of the IEEE Circuits and Systems Society (2006) and IEEE Director (2014-2015).

== Awards and recognition ==
- 2013: IEEE Technical Activities Board Hall of Honor - "For transforming the TAB Society Review Committee through the adoption of new policies and processes to the benefit of societies and all of TAB."
- 2009: IEEE CAS Meritorious Service Award - "For dedicated service to the IEEE CAS Society and its membership and for leadership and technical contributions in the field of electronic design automation".
- 2006: Marie Pistilli Award - "Ellen's technical contributions, coupled with her professional activities and her advocacy for the recognition of the design automation profession in the greater technical and business community, make her most deserving of this award".
- 2002 IEEE Fellow
