= Mary Jane Irwin =

American computer scientist

- Education: University of Illinois Urbana-Champaign; Memphis State University
- Awards: ACM Fellow (1996); IEEE Fellow (1995); NAE (2003)
- Scientific career
- Fields: Computer Science, Computer Architecture, Electronic Design Automation
- Workplaces: Pennsylvania State University
- Doctoral advisor: James Robertson

Mary Jane Irwin is an emerita Evan Pugh Professor in the Department of Computer Science and Engineering at Pennsylvania State University. She has been on the faculty at Penn State since 1977. She is an international expert in computer architecture. Her research and teaching interests include computer architecture, embedded and mobile computing systems design, power and reliability aware design, and emerging technologies in computing systems.

Irwin was elected a member of the National Academy of Engineering in 2003 for contributions to very-large-scale-integration (VLSI) architecture and automated design.

== Biography ==
=== Education ===
Irwin received her B.S. in mathematics from Memphis State University in 1971, and her M.S. and Ph.D. in Computer Science from the University of Illinois Urbana-Champaign in 1975 and 1977, respectively. Her dissertation research on the topic of computer arithmetic was supervised by Dr. James Robertson.

=== Career ===
Irwin joined the faculty of the Pennsylvania State University as an assistant professor in 1977. She was promoted to the rank of full professor in 1989, and retired in 2017.

Irwin has worked in the area of application-specific architectures, including the design, implementation, and field-testing of three different board level designs—the Arithmetic Cube, the MGAP and SPARTA. With her student Robert M. Owens, they developed a suite of architecture, logic and circuit design tools, including ARTIST, PERFLEX, LOGICIAN, and DECOMPOSER.

In late 1993, Irwin worked in the area of resource-constrained systems design, including embedded systems that have limited battery life and limited memory space and sensor network systems with extremely limited resources. With colleagues she developed an architectural level power simulator, SimplePower.

Irwin's recent work is in mixed technology circuits.

On October 1, 2019, the Institute of Electrical and Electronics Engineers (IEEE), Council on Electronic Design Automation (CEDA), and Electronic System Design (ESD) Alliance announced that Irwin would receive the 2019 Phil Kaufman Award—the electronic design automation industry's highest honor—making her the first woman to receive the award. In 2024, she was awarded the Gustav Robert Kirchhoff Award.

=== Other positions ===
Irwin is a member of the Board on Army Science and Technology, of the Association for Computing Machinery's (ACM) Fellows Selection Committee, of Microsoft Research's External Research Advisory Board, and of the National Academy of Engineering's Committee on Membership (Chair for the Class of 2012). Previously, she served as a founding co-editor-in-chief of ACM's Journal on Emerging Technologies in Computing Systems and as editor-in-chief of ACM's Transactions on the Design Automation of Electronic Systems, as an elected member of the Computing Research Association's Board of Directors, of the IEEE Computer Society's Board of Governors, of ACM's Council, and as Vice President of ACM. She was also a long-time board member of the Committee on Widening Participation in Computing Research (CRA-W), the CRA's Committee on the Status of Women, where she is now a member emerita.

=== Personal life ===
Irwin was married in July 1966. She and her husband have one son, John, who is also a computer scientist, and two grandchildren, Kai and Milo.

== Honors and awards ==
- 2021 The CRA A. Nico Habermann Award
- Irwin received an Honorary Doctorate from Chalmers University, Sweden
- 2019 Phil Kaufman Award of the Electronic System Design Alliance and the IEEE Council on Electronic Design Automation
- 2012 ASP-DAC Ten-Year Retrospective Most Influential Paper Award
- 2010 The ACM Athena Lecturer Award, Association for Computing Machinery, having been separately nominated by both the Computer Architecture and the Design Automation research communities
- 2009 inducted into the American Academy of Arts and Sciences
- 2007 Anita Borg Technical Leadership Award
- 2006 Computing Research Association (CRA) Distinguished Service Award
- 2005 ACM Distinguished Service Award
- 2004 Marie R. Pistilli Women in Electronic Design Automation Award
- 2003 Institute of Electrical and Electronics Engineers/CAS VLSI Transactions Best Paper of the Year Award
- 2003 inducted into the National Academy of Engineering
- 1996 Association for Computing Machinery] Fellow
- 1994 Institute of Electrical and Electronics Engineers Fellow
