= Xiaobo Sharon Hu =

Chinese-American computer scientist

Xiaobo Sharon Hu is a Chinese-American computer scientist and engineer known for her work on hardware-software integration, power usage, and reliability of embedded systems design, including work on power- and temperature-aware scheduling algorithms. She has also published highly cited work on deep neural networks, the CORDIC algorithm for trigonometric calculations, and clocking of unconventional computer architectures. She is a professor in the Department of Computer Science and Engineering at the University of Notre Dame.

== Education and career ==
Hu grew up in China as the daughter of two engineers. She studied engineering at Tianjin University, graduating in 1982. After a master's degree in 1984 in electrophysics at the Polytechnic Institute of New York, she completed a Ph.D. in electrical engineering in 1989 at Purdue University.

While continuing her graduate education, Hu worked as an engineer for Delco Electronics, and after completing her Ph.D. she was a researcher for four years at General Motors Research Laboratories. In 1993 she returned to academia as an assistant professor in electrical and computer engineering and computer science at Western Michigan University. She moved to the University of Notre Dame in 1996, at that time and for several years later the only woman faculty member of her department. She earned tenure there as an associate professor in 2000, and was promoted to full professor in 2008.

She has chaired the Special Interest Group on Design Automation of the Association for Computing Machinery since 2018 and has been editor-in-chief of ACM Transactions on Design Automation of Electronic Systems since 2020. Hu served as general chair of the 2018 Design Automation Conference.

== Recognition ==
Hu was named an IEEE Fellow in 2016, "for contributions to resource management for embedded systems". She was named a 2021 ACM Fellow "for contributions to the design of power-constrained and real-time embedded systems".
