= Kaushik Roy =

Kaushik Roy may refer to:

- Kaushik Roy (engineer)
- Kaushik Roy (politician)

== See also ==
- Koushik Roy, actor
