= Mar Hershenson =

American electrical engineer and entrepreneur

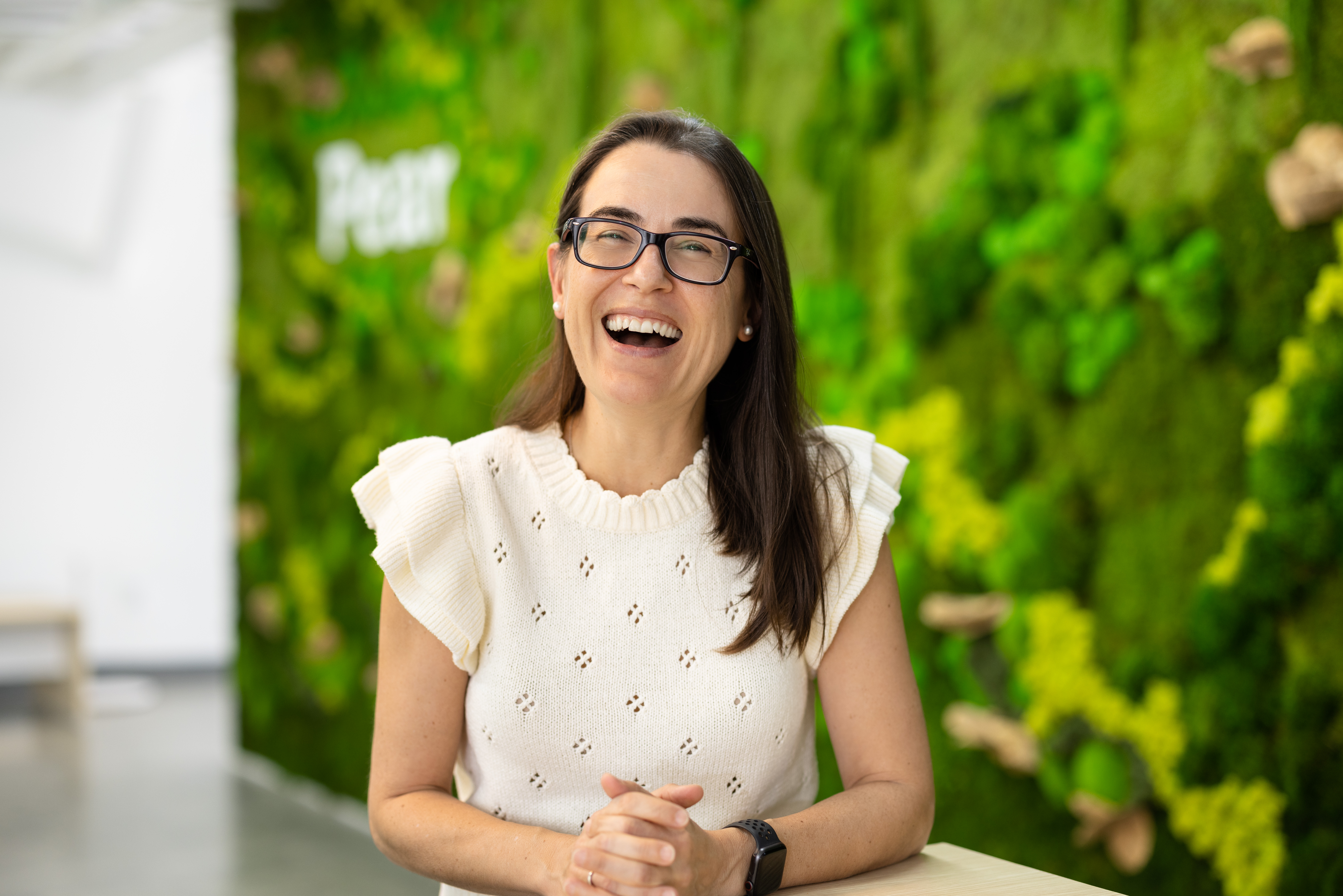
- Occupations: Venture capitalist, electrical engineer, professor, business executive
- Years active: 2004-present

Mar Hershenson is a Spanish-American venture capitalist, electrical engineer, professor, and business executive in the electronic design automation industry. She is the co-founder and managing partner at Pear VC. In 2021, she ranked #29 on Forbes' Midas List.

== Education and work ==
Hershenson graduated with honors with a B.S. in electrical engineering from the Universidad Pontificia Comillas in Madrid, Spain.

She earned M.S. and Ph.D. (2000) from Stanford University. Her graduate research involved application of convex optimization to analog circuit design.

As a graduate student at Stanford, she was CTO and co-founder of Barcelona Design. Later she was CEO and a co-founder of Sabio Labs (2004-2007), which was acquired by Magma Design Automation, and eventually, Mar Hershenson became Vice President of Product Development in the Custom Design Business Unit at Magma (2008-2010).

From 2002-2011, she was consulting assistant professor in electrical engineering at Stanford.

Since 2013, she has been a founding managing partner at Pear VC (founded as Pejman Mar) and represents Pear on the Board of Directors of Solvvy, a startup developer of a customer support platform designed to answer incoming customer questions basing on machine learning.

She was described as "one of the leading women in venture capital in the Bay Area".

== Awards and recognition ==
- 2011: Women of Influence Award by Silicon Valley/San Jose Business Journal
- 2010: Marie Pistilli Award
- 2009: Top Ten Women in Microelectronics by EE Times
- 2002: MIT Technology Review’s TR100 Innovators under 35

== Personal life ==
She came to the United States from Barcelona, Spain for a summer job and met her future husband. Her native city gave the name to the company she co-founded.

As of 2010 she has three children.
