= Karen Bartleson =

American executive

Karen Bartleson is an American executive. She was Senior Director of Corporate Programs and Initiatives at Synopsys, retiring in 2016.

As of 2020 she has worked in electronic design automation / semiconductor industry nearly 40 years, including at Synopsys, United Technologies Microelectronics Center and Texas Instruments.

She joined Synopsys in 1995 as standards manager.

In 2010 she authored the book The Ten Commandments for Effective Standards. The book is based on the posts from her blog "The Standards Game" hosted at the Synopsys website since 2007.

She was IEEE President in 2017 and a member of the IEEE Board of Directors in 2013 and 2014. Karen was President of the IEEE Standards Association in 2013 and 2014.

Karen Bartleson earned her B.S in Engineering Science from California Polytechnic State University in 1980

== Awards and recognition ==
- 2003: Marie Pistilli Award
