= Spierings Kranen =

Dutch crane manufacturer

- Industry: Machine
- Founded: 1987
- Founders: Leo Spierings; Tiny Spierings
- Headquarters: Oss, Netherlands
- Products: Mobile Cranes
- Website: www.spieringscranes.com/en/

Spierings Kranen is a Dutch manufacturer of large mobile cranes.

The company is based in Oss in southern Netherland. It was founded by Leo Spierings and his wife Tiny in 1987. As of 2023, all cranes are made in Oss.

In 2003 they introduced the SK 1265-AT6, nicknamed Mighty Tiny. It was characterized as the biggest truck-mounted crane, and was dedicated to the memory of co-founder Tiny Spierings who died in 2001. The 350th was delivered in 2023.

Around 2019 the company introduced eLift, allowing the operator to choose pure electric lifting or diesel-based lifting.

In 2023 they announced an end to diesel-only powered cranes, only making hybrid or purely electric (eDrive) cranes.

== Models as of 2026 ==
- 3-axle: SK487-AT3 "City Boy" eDrive (7 tons). All electric.
- 4-axle: SK597-AT4 eLift (7 tons)
- 5 or 6-axle: SK1265-AT5 (or AT6) "Mighty Tiny" eLift (10 tons)
- beltdriven: SK2400-R eLift (18 tons)

== Gallery of various models ==
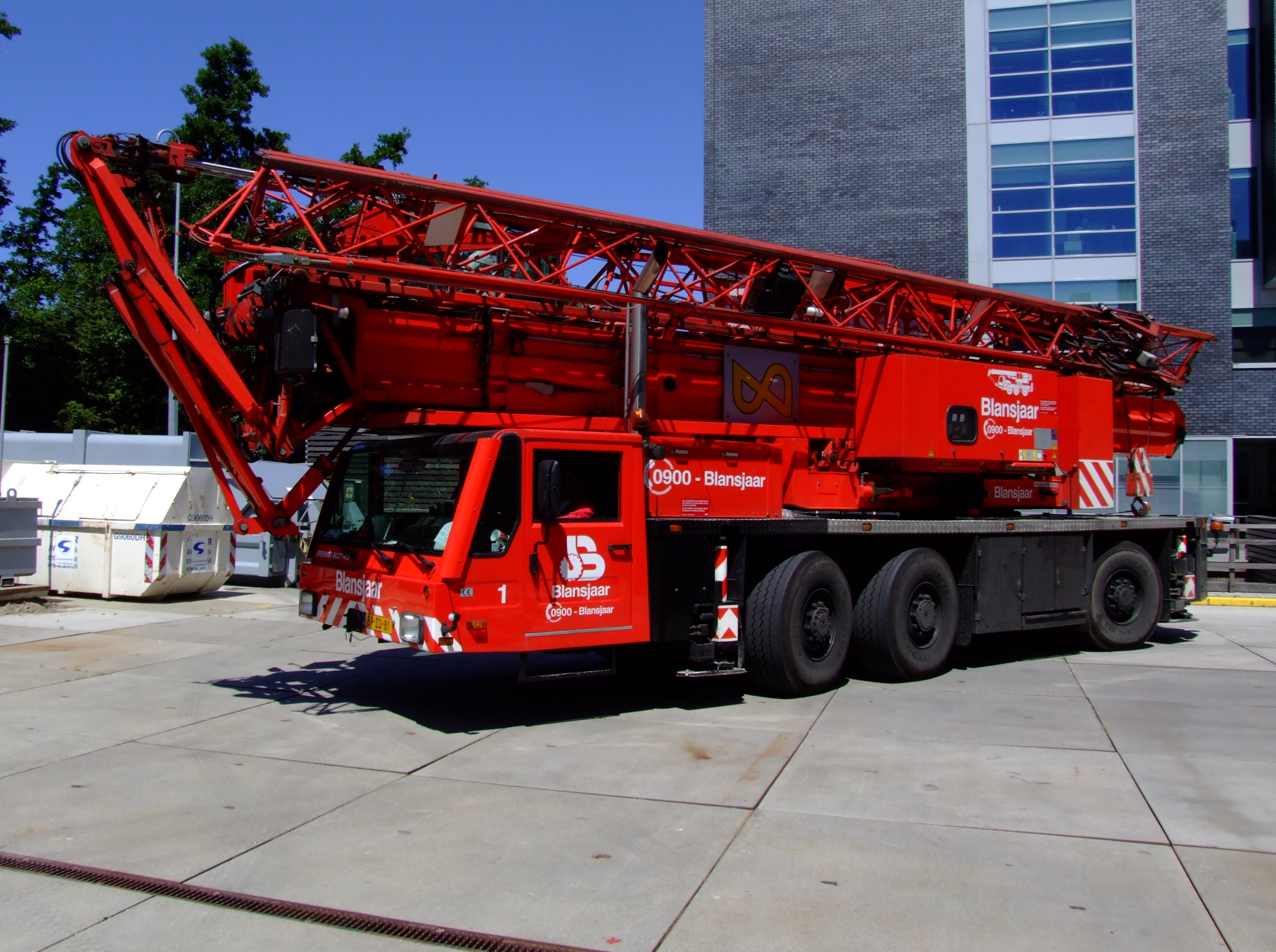
SK377-AT3 in 2008

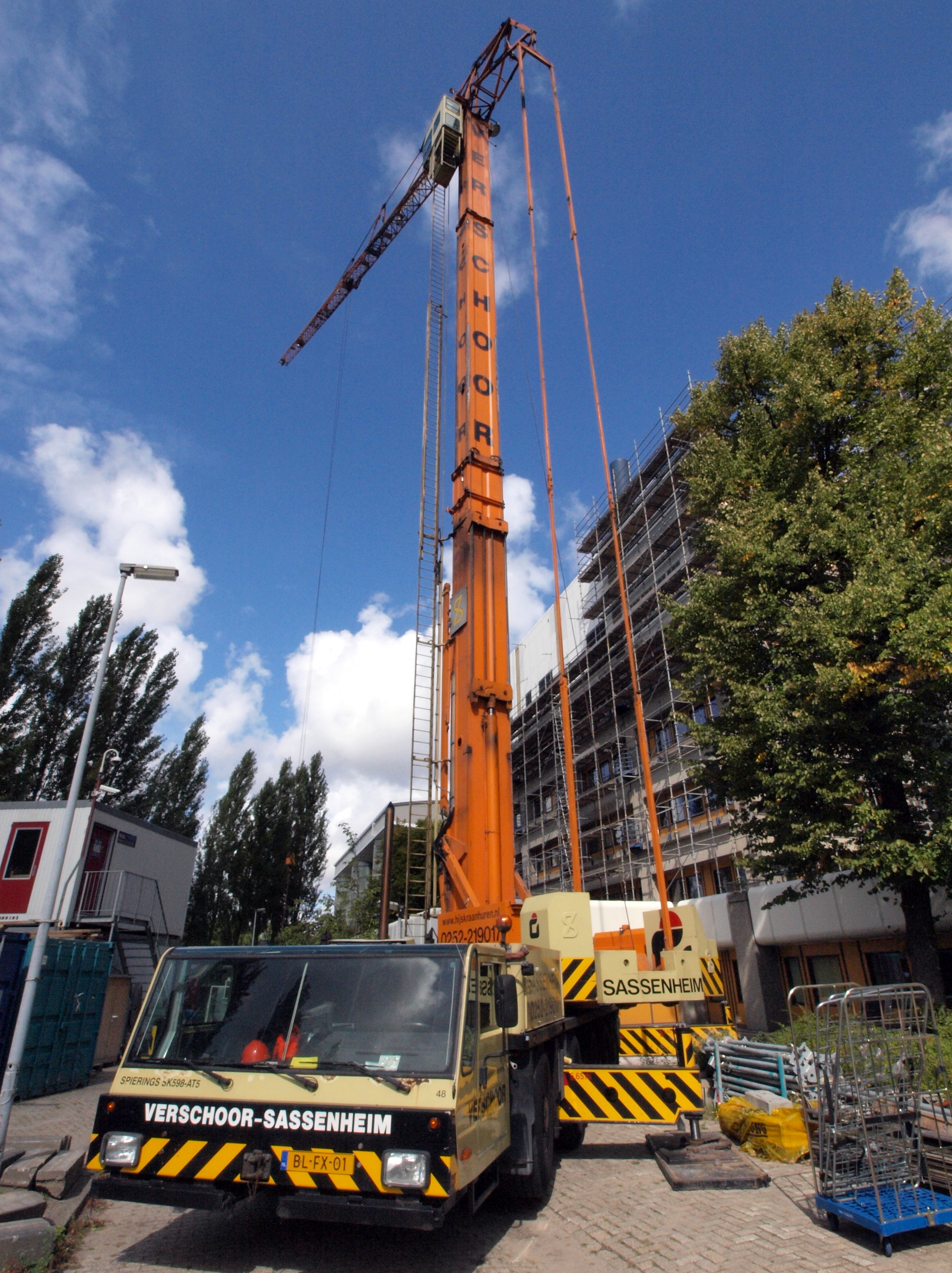
SK598-AT5 in 2012

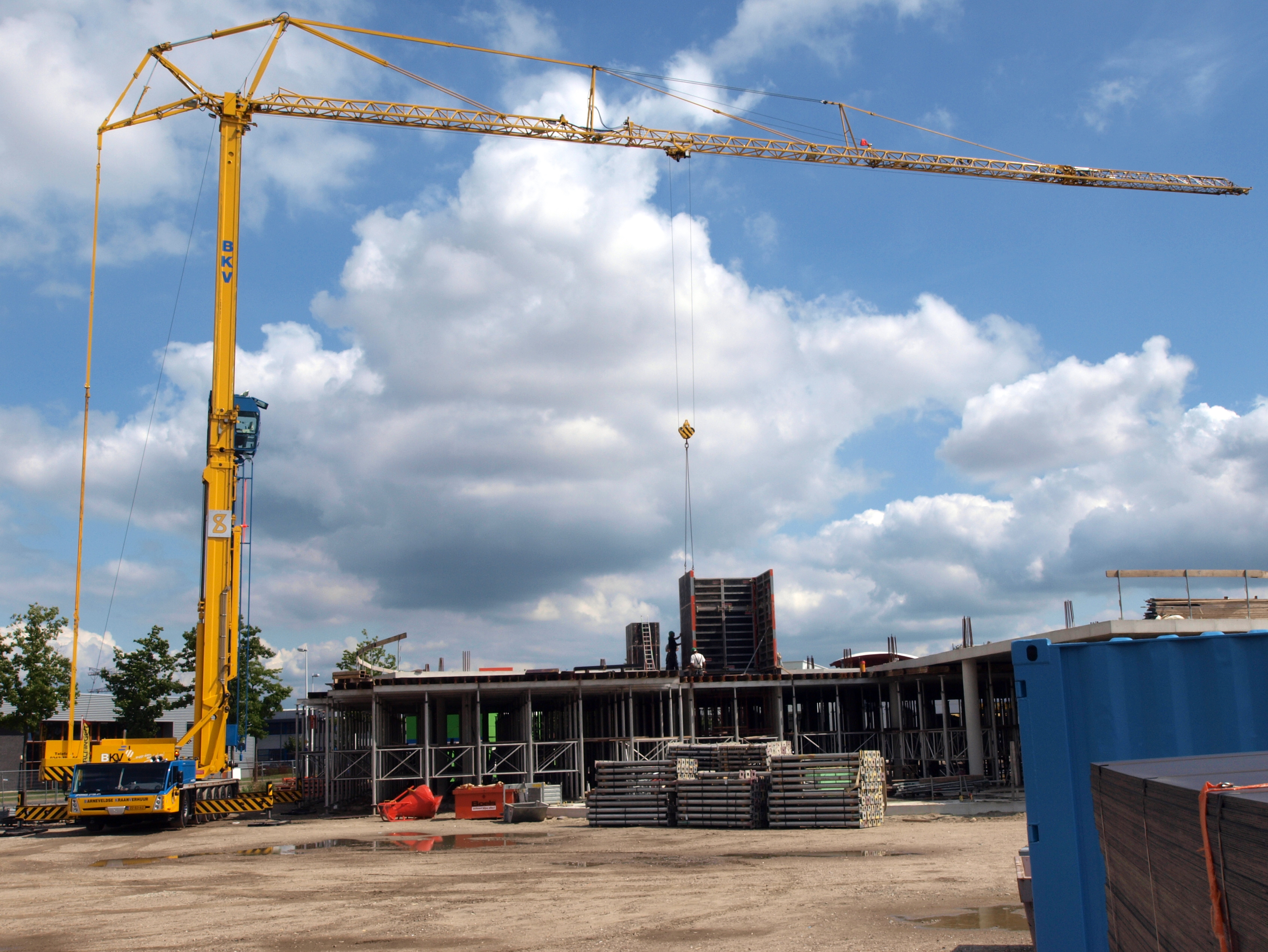
SK1265-AT6 in 2009

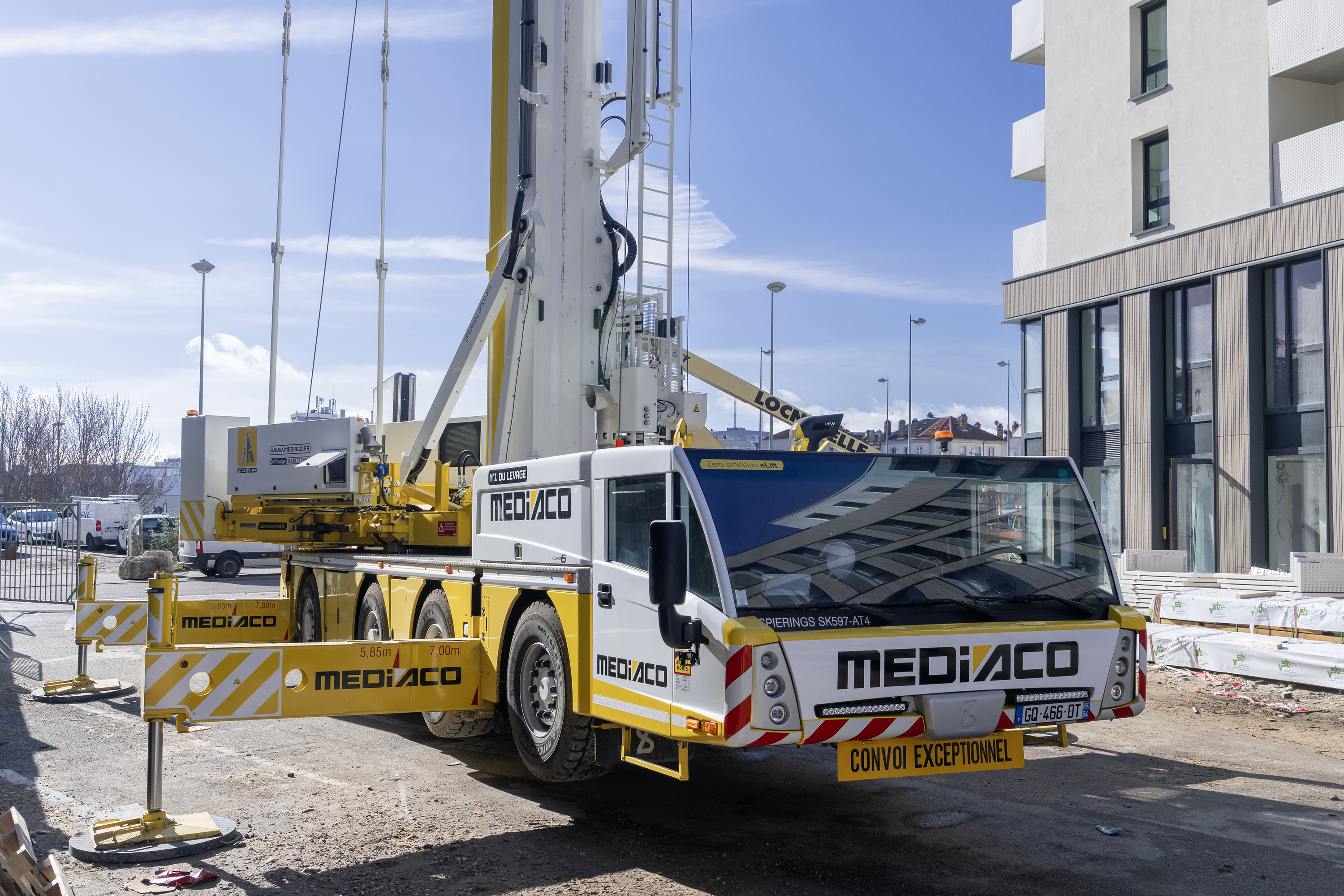
SK597-AT4 eLift in 2019
