= Special Interest Group on Design Automation =

Association for Computing Machinery special interest group

SIGDA, Association for Computing Machinery's Special Interest Group on Design Automation, is a professional development organization for the electronic design automation (EDA) community. SIGDA is organized and operated exclusively for educational, scientific, and technical purposes in electronic design automation. SIGDA's bylaws were approved in 1969, following the charter of SIC (Special Interest Committee) in Design Automation in 1965.

The mission of SIGDA and its activities includes collecting and disseminating information in design automation through a newsletter and other publications; organizing sessions at conferences sponsored by ACM; sponsoring conferences, symposia, and workshops; organizing projects and working groups for education, research, and development; serving as a source of technical information for the Council and subunits of the ACM; and representing the opinions and expertise of the membership on matters of technical interest to SIGDA or ACM.

SIGDA sponsors or co-sponsors several conferences and symposia, while supporting numerous professional development programs addressing the needs of EDA students, researchers, and engineers. SIGDA was a pioneer in electronic publishing of conference and symposia proceedings, long before the wide availability of digital libraries made available by major professional organizations. SIGDA volunteers also pioneered several educational initiatives that have enabled the participance of many students and researchers to major events in EDA and computer-aided design (CAD).

== SIGDA Chairs ==
- Yiran Chen, Duke University (2021–present)
- Xiaobo Sharon Hu, University of Notre Dame (2018–2021)
- Vijaykrishnan Narayanan, The Pennsylvania State University (2015–2018)
- Naehyuck Chang, KAIST (2012–2015)
- Patrick Madden, SUNY (2009–2012)
- Diana Marculescu, University of Texas at Austin (2006–2009)
