= TDFA =

TDFA may refer to:

- Tennessee Department of Finance and Administration
- Thiruvananthapuram District Football Association
- Tagged Deterministic Finite Automaton
