= QFA =

QFA may refer to:

- Qantas Airways
- Qatar Football Association, the governing body for football in Qatar.
- Quantum finite automata
- Qualified Financial Adviser (Republic of Ireland)
- Queensland Football Association, an early governing body for Australian rules football and rugby union
- Qeshm Free Area
- Quality Franchise Association, one of 3 trade associations in the UK that provide support to the franchising industry.
