= Probabilistic automaton =

In mathematics and computer science, the probabilistic automaton (PA) is a generalization of the nondeterministic finite automaton; it includes the probability of a given transition into the transition function, turning it into a transition matrix. Thus, the probabilistic automaton also generalizes the concepts of a Markov chain and of a subshift of finite type. The languages recognized by probabilistic automata are called stochastic languages; these include the regular languages as a subset. The number of stochastic languages is uncountable.

The concept was introduced by Michael O. Rabin in 1963; a certain special case is sometimes known as the Rabin automaton (not to be confused with the subclass of ω-automata also referred to as Rabin automata). In recent years, a variant has been formulated in terms of quantum probabilities, the quantum finite automaton.

== Informal Description ==
For a given initial state and input character, a deterministic finite automaton (DFA) has exactly one next state, and a nondeterministic finite automaton (NFA) has a set of next states. A probabilistic automaton (PA) instead has a weighted set (or vector) of next states, where the weights must sum to 1 and therefore can be interpreted as probabilities (making it a stochastic vector). The notions states and acceptance must also be modified to reflect the introduction of these weights. The state of the machine as a given step must now also be represented by a stochastic vector of states, and a state accepted if its total probability of being in an acceptance state exceeds some cut-off.

A PA is in some sense a half-way step from deterministic to non-deterministic, as it allows a set of next states but with restrictions on their weights. However, this is somewhat misleading, as the PA utilizes the notion of the real numbers to define the weights, which is absent in the definition of both DFAs and NFAs. This additional freedom enables them to decide languages that are not regular, such as the p-adic languages with irrational parameters. As such, PAs are more powerful than both DFAs and NFAs (which are equally powerful).

== Formal Definition ==
The probabilistic automaton may be defined as an extension of a nondeterministic finite automaton $(Q,\Sigma,\delta,q_0,F)$, together with two probabilities: the probability $P$ of a particular state transition taking place, and with the initial state $q_0$ replaced by a stochastic vector giving the probability of the automaton being in a given initial state.

For the ordinary non-deterministic finite automaton, one has

- a finite set of states $Q$
- a finite set of input symbols $\Sigma$
- a transition function $\delta:Q\times\Sigma \to \wp(Q)$
- a set of states $F$ distinguished as accepting (or final) states $F\subseteq Q$.

Here, $\wp(Q)$ denotes the power set of $Q$.

By use of currying, the transition function $\delta:Q\times\Sigma \to \wp(Q)$ of a non-deterministic finite automaton can be written as a membership function

$$\delta:Q\times\Sigma \times Q\to \{0,1\}$$

so that $\delta(q,a,q^\prime)=1$ if $q^\prime\in \delta(q,a)$ and $0$ otherwise. The curried transition function can be understood to be a matrix with matrix entries

$$\left[\theta_a\right]_{qq^\prime}=\delta(q,a,q^\prime)$$

The matrix $\theta_a$ is then a square matrix, whose entries are zero or one, indicating whether a transition $q\stackrel{a}{\rightarrow} q^\prime$ is allowed by the NFA. Such a transition matrix is always defined for a non-deterministic finite automaton.

The probabilistic automaton replaces these matrices by a family of right stochastic matrices $P_a$, for each symbol a in the alphabet $\Sigma$ so that the probability of a transition is given by

$$\left[P_a\right]_{qq^\prime}$$

A state change from some state to any state must occur with probability one, of course, and so one must have

$$\sum_{q^\prime}\left[P_a\right]_{qq^\prime}=1$$

for all input letters $a$ and internal states $q$. The initial state of a probabilistic automaton is given by a row vector $v$, whose components are the probabilities of the individual initial states $q$, that add to 1:

$$\sum_{q}\left[v\right]_{q}=1$$

The transition matrix acts on the right, so that the state of the probabilistic automaton, after consuming the input string $abc$, would be

$$v P_a P_b P_c$$

In particular, the state of a probabilistic automaton is always a stochastic vector, since the product of any two stochastic matrices is a stochastic matrix, and the product of a stochastic vector and a stochastic matrix is again a stochastic vector. This vector is sometimes called the distribution of states, emphasizing that it is a discrete probability distribution.

Formally, the definition of a probabilistic automaton does not require the mechanics of the non-deterministic automaton, which may be dispensed with. Formally, a probabilistic automaton PA is defined as the tuple $(Q,\Sigma,P, v, F)$. A Rabin automaton is one for which the initial distribution $v$ is a coordinate vector; that is, has zero for all but one entries, and the remaining entry being one.

== Stochastic languages ==
The set of languages recognized by probabilistic automata are called stochastic languages. They include the regular languages as a subset.

Let $F=Q_\text{accept}\subseteq Q$ be the set of "accepting" or "final" states of the automaton. By abuse of notation, $Q_\text{accept}$ can also be understood to be the column vector that is the membership function for $Q_\text{accept}$; that is, it has a 1 at the places corresponding to elements in $Q_\text{accept}$, and a zero otherwise. This vector may be contracted with the internal state probability, to form a scalar. The language recognized by a specific automaton is then defined as

$$L_\eta = \{s\in\Sigma^* \vert vP_s Q_\text{accept} > \eta\}$$

where $\Sigma^*$ is the set of all strings in the alphabet $\Sigma$ (so that * is the Kleene star). The language depends on the value of the cut-point $\eta$, normally taken to be in the range $0\le \eta<1$.

A language is called η-stochastic if and only if there exists some PA that recognizes the language, for fixed $\eta$. A language is called stochastic if and only if there is some $0\le \eta<1$ for which $L_\eta$ is η-stochastic.

A cut-point is said to be an isolated cut-point if and only if there exists a $\delta>0$ such that

$$\vert vP(s)Q_\text{accept} - \eta \vert \ge \delta$$

for all $s\in\Sigma^*$

== Properties ==
Every regular language is stochastic, and more strongly, every regular language is η-stochastic. A weak converse is that every 0-stochastic language is regular; however, the general converse does not hold: there are stochastic languages that are not regular.

Every η-stochastic language is stochastic, for some $0<\eta<1$.

Every stochastic language is representable by a Rabin automaton.

If $\eta$ is an isolated cut-point, then $L_\eta$ is a regular language.

== p-adic languages ==
The p-adic languages provide an example of a stochastic language that is not regular, and also show that the number of stochastic languages is uncountable. A p-adic language is defined as the set of strings

$$L_{\eta}(p)=\{n_1n_2n_3 \ldots \vert 0\le n_k<p \text{ and }
0.n_1n_2n_3\ldots > \eta \}$$

in the letters $0,1,2,\ldots,(p-1)$.

That is, a p-adic language is merely the set of real numbers in [0, 1], written in base-p, such that they are greater than $\eta$. It is straightforward to show that all p-adic languages are stochastic. In particular, this implies that the number of stochastic languages is uncountable. A p-adic language is regular if and only if $\eta$ is rational.

== Generalizations ==
The probabilistic automaton has a geometric interpretation: the state vector can be understood to be a point that lives on the face of the standard simplex, opposite to the orthogonal corner. The transition matrices form a monoid, acting on the point. This may be generalized by having the point be from some general topological space, while the transition matrices are chosen from a collection of operators acting on the topological space, thus forming a semiautomaton. When the cut-point is suitably generalized, one has a topological automaton.

An example of such a generalization is the quantum finite automaton; here, the automaton state is represented by a point in complex projective space, while the transition matrices are a fixed set chosen from the unitary group. The cut-point is understood as a limit on the maximum value of the quantum angle.

== See also ==
- Weighted automaton
