= Alternating tree automata =

Extension of nondeterministic tree automaton

In automata theory, an alternating tree automaton (ATA) is a generalisation of a nondeterministic tree automaton in the same way that an alternating finite automaton is a generalisation of a nondeterministic finite automaton (NFA).

== Computational complexity ==
The emptiness problem (deciding whether the language of an input ATA is empty) for ATAs, and therefore its complement, the universality problem, are EXPTIME-complete. The membership problem (testing whether an input tree is accepted by an input AFA) is in PTIME.
