= Two-way finite automaton =

Type of finite automaton in automata theory

In computer science, in particular in automata theory, a two-way finite automaton is a finite automaton that is allowed to re-read its input.

== Two-way deterministic finite automaton ==
A two-way deterministic finite automaton (2DFA) is an abstract machine, a generalized version of the deterministic finite automaton (DFA) which can revisit characters already processed. As in a DFA, there are a finite number of states with transitions between them based on the current character, but each transition is also labelled with a value indicating whether the machine will move its position in the input to the left, right, or stay at the same position. Equivalently, 2DFAs can be seen as read-only Turing machines with no work tape, only a read-only input tape.

2DFAs were introduced in a seminal 1959 paper by Rabin and Scott, who proved them to have equivalent power to one-way DFAs. That is, any formal language which can be recognized by a 2DFA can be recognized by a DFA which only examines and consumes each character in order. Since DFAs are obviously a special case of 2DFAs, this implies that both kinds of machines recognize precisely the class of regular languages. However, the equivalent DFA for a 2DFA may require exponentially many states, making 2DFAs a much more practical representation for algorithms for some common problems.

2DFAs are also equivalent to read-only Turing machines that use only a constant amount of space on their work tape, since any constant amount of information can be incorporated into the finite control state via a product construction (a state for each combination of work tape state and control state).

== Formal description ==
Formally, a two-way deterministic finite automaton can be described by the following 8-tuple: $M=(Q,\Sigma,L,R,\delta,s,t,r)$ where

- $Q$ is the finite, non-empty set of states
- $\Sigma$ is the finite, non-empty set of input symbols
- $L$ is the left endmarker
- $R$ is the right endmarker
- $\delta: Q \times (\Sigma \cup \{L,R\}) \rightarrow Q \times \{\mathrm{left,right}\}$
- $s$ is the start state
- $t$ is the end state
- $r$ is the reject state

In addition, the following two conditions must also be satisfied:

- For all $q \in Q$

$\delta(q,L)=(q^\prime,\mathrm{right})$ for some $q^\prime \in Q$
$\delta(q,R)=(q^\prime,\mathrm{left})$ for some $q^\prime \in Q$

It says that there must be some transition possible when the pointer reaches either end of the input word.

- For all symbols $\sigma \in \Sigma \cup \{L\}$

$$\delta(t,\sigma)=(t,\mathrm{right})$$
$$\delta(r,\sigma)=(r,\mathrm{right})$$
$$\delta(t,R)=(t,\mathrm{left})$$
$$\delta(r,R)=(r,\mathrm{left})$$

It says that once the automaton reaches the accept or reject state, it stays in there forever and the pointer goes to the right most symbol and cycles there infinitely.

== Two-way nondeterministic finite automaton ==
A two-way nondeterministic finite automaton (2NFA) may have multiple transitions defined in the same configuration. Its transition function is

- $\delta: Q \times (\Sigma \cup \{L,R\}) \rightarrow 2^{Q \times \{\mathrm{left,right}\}}$.

Like a standard one-way NFA, a 2NFA accepts a string if at least one of the possible computations is accepting. Like the 2DFAs, the 2NFAs also accept only regular languages.

== Two-way alternating finite automaton ==
A two-way alternating finite automaton (2AFA) is a two-way extension of an alternating finite automaton (AFA). Its state set is

- $Q=Q_\exists \cup Q_\forall$ where $Q_\exists \cap Q_\forall=\emptyset$.

States in $Q_\exists$ and $Q_\forall$ are called existential resp. universal. In an existential state a 2AFA nondeterministically chooses the next state like an NFA, and accepts if at least one of the resulting computations accepts. In a universal state 2AFA moves to all next states, and accepts if all the resulting computations accept.

== State complexity tradeoffs ==
Two-way and one-way finite automata, deterministic and nondeterministic and alternating, accept the same class of regular languages. However, transforming an automaton of one type to an equivalent automaton of another type incurs a blow-up in the number of states. Christos Kapoutsis determined that transforming an $n$-state 2DFA to an equivalent DFA requires $n(n^n-(n-1)^n)$ states in the worst case. If an $n$-state 2DFA or a 2NFA is transformed to an NFA, the worst-case number of states required is $\binom{2n}{n+1} = O\left(\frac{4^n}{\sqrt{n}}\right)$. Ladner, Lipton and Stockmeyer. proved that an $n$-state 2AFA can be converted to a DFA with $2^{n2^n}$ states. The 2AFA to NFA conversion requires $2^{\Theta(n \log n)}$ states in the worst case, see Geffert and Okhotin.

Unsolved problem in computer science
Does every $n$-state 2NFA have an equivalent $\operatorname{poly}(n)$-state 2DFA?
More unsolved problems in computer science

It is an open problem whether every 2NFA can be converted to a 2DFA with only a polynomial increase in the number of states. The problem was raised by Sakoda and Sipser, who compared it to the P vs. NP problem in the computational complexity theory. Berman and Lingas discovered a formal relation between this problem and the L vs. NL open problem, see Kapoutsis for a precise relation.

== Sweeping automata ==
Sweeping automata are 2DFAs of a special kind that process the input string by making alternating left-to-right and right-to-left sweeps, turning only at the endmarkers. Sipser constructed a sequence of languages, each accepted by an n-state NFA, yet which is not accepted by any sweeping automata with fewer than $2^n$ states.

== Two-way quantum finite automaton ==
The concept of 2DFAs was in 1997 generalized to quantum computing by John Watrous's "On the Power of 2-Way Quantum Finite State Automata", in which he demonstrates that these machines can recognize nonregular languages and so are more powerful than DFAs.

== Two-way pushdown automaton ==
A pushdown automaton that is allowed to move either way on its input tape is called two-way pushdown automaton (2PDA); it has been studied by Hartmanis, Lewis, and Stearns (1965). Aho, Hopcroft, Ullman (1968) and Cook (1971) characterized the class of languages recognizable by deterministic (2DPDA) and non-deterministic (2NPDA) two-way pushdown automata; Gray, Harrison, and Ibarra (1967) investigated the closure properties of these languages.
