= Epsilon transition =

An epsilon transition (also epsilon move or lambda transition) allows an automaton to change its state spontaneously, i.e. without consuming an input symbol. It may appear in almost all kinds of nondeterministic automaton in formal language theory, in particular:

- Nondeterministic Turing machine
- Nondeterministic pushdown automaton
- Nondeterministic finite automaton
