= String operations =

Operations in formal language theory

In computer science, in the area of formal language theory, frequent use is made of a variety of string functions; however, the notation used is different from that used for computer programming, and some commonly used functions in the theoretical realm are rarely used when programming. This article defines some of these basic terms.

== Strings and languages ==
A string is a finite sequence of characters. The empty string is denoted by $\varepsilon$. The concatenation of two strings $s$ and $t$ is denoted by $s \cdot t$, or shorter by $s t$. Concatenating with the empty string makes no difference: $s \cdot \varepsilon = s = \varepsilon \cdot s$. Concatenation of strings is associative: $s \cdot (t \cdot u) = (s \cdot t) \cdot u$.

For example, $(\langle b \rangle \cdot \langle l \rangle) \cdot (\varepsilon \cdot \langle ah \rangle) = \langle bl \rangle \cdot \langle ah \rangle = \langle blah \rangle$.

A language is a finite or infinite set of strings. Besides the usual set operations like union, intersection etc., concatenation can be applied to languages: if both $S$ and $T$ are languages, their concatenation $S \cdot T$ is defined as the set of concatenations of any string from $S$ and any string from $T$, formally $S \cdot T = \{ s \cdot t \mid s \in S \land t \in T \}$. Again, the concatenation dot $\cdot$ is often omitted for brevity.

The language $\{\varepsilon\}$ consisting of just the empty string is to be distinguished from the empty language $\{\}$. Concatenating any language with the former doesn't make any change: $S \cdot \{\varepsilon\} = S = \{\varepsilon\} \cdot S$, while concatenating with the latter always yields the empty language: $S \cdot \{\} = \{\} = \{\} \cdot S$. Concatenation of languages is associative: $S \cdot (T \cdot U) = (S \cdot T) \cdot U$.

For example, abbreviating $D = \{ \langle 0 \rangle, \langle 1 \rangle, \langle 2 \rangle, \langle 3 \rangle, \langle 4 \rangle, \langle 5 \rangle, \langle 6 \rangle, \langle 7 \rangle, \langle 8 \rangle, \langle 9 \rangle \}$, the set of all three-digit decimal numbers is obtained as $D \cdot D \cdot D$. The set of all decimal numbers of arbitrary length is an example for an infinite language.

== Alphabet of a string ==
The alphabet of a string is the set of all of the characters that occur in a particular string. If s is a string, its alphabet is denoted by

$$\operatorname{Alph}(s)$$

The alphabet of a language $S$ is the set of all characters that occur in any string of $S$, formally: $\operatorname{Alph}(S) = \bigcup_{s \in S} \operatorname{Alph}(s)$.

For example, the set $\{\langle a \rangle,\langle c \rangle,\langle o \rangle\}$ is the alphabet of the string $\langle cacao \rangle$, and the above $D$ is the alphabet of the above language $D \cdot D \cdot D$ as well as of the language of all decimal numbers.

== String substitution ==
Let L be a language, and let Σ be its alphabet. A string substitution or simply a substitution is a mapping f that maps characters in Σ to languages (possibly in a different alphabet). Thus, for example, given a character a ∈ Σ, one has f(a)=L_{a} where L_{a} ⊆ Δ^{*} is some language whose alphabet is Δ. This mapping may be extended to strings as

f(ε)=ε

for the empty string ε, and

f(sa)=f(s)f(a)

for string s ∈ L and character a ∈ Σ. String substitutions may be extended to entire languages as

$$f(L)=\bigcup_{s\in L} f(s)$$

Regular languages are closed under string substitution. That is, if each character in the alphabet of a regular language is substituted by another regular language, the result is still a regular language. Similarly, context-free languages are closed under string substitution. (Note: Although every regular language is also context-free, the previous theorem is not implied by the current one, since the former yields a shaper result for regular languages.)

A simple example is the conversion f_{uc}(.) to uppercase, which may be defined e.g. as follows:

character	mapped to language	remark
x	f_{uc}(x)	
‹a›	{ ‹A› }	map lowercase char to corresponding uppercase char
‹A›	{ ‹A› }	map uppercase char to itself
‹ß›	{ ‹SS› }	no uppercase char available, map to two-char string
‹0›	{ ε }	map digit to empty string
‹!›	{ }	forbid punctuation, map to empty language
...		similar for other chars

For the extension of f_{uc} to strings, we have e.g.

- f_{uc}(‹Straße›) = {‹S›} ⋅ {‹T›} ⋅ {‹R›} ⋅ {‹A›} ⋅ {‹SS›} ⋅ {‹E›} = {‹STRASSE›},
- f_{uc}(‹u2›) = {‹U›} ⋅ {ε} = {‹U›}, and
- f_{uc}(‹Go!›) = {‹G›} ⋅ {‹O›} ⋅ {} = {}.

For the extension of f_{uc} to languages, we have e.g.

- f_{uc}({ ‹Straße›, ‹u2›, ‹Go!› }) = { ‹STRASSE› } ∪ { ‹U› } ∪ { } = { ‹STRASSE›, ‹U› }.

== String homomorphism ==
A string homomorphism (often referred to simply as a homomorphism in formal language theory) is a string substitution such that each character is replaced by a single string. That is, $f(a)=s$, where $s$ is a string, for each character $a$. (Note: Strictly formally, a homomorphism yields a language consisting of just one string, i.e. $f(a) = \{s\}$.)

String homomorphisms are monoid morphisms on the free monoid, preserving the empty string and the binary operation of string concatenation. Given a language $L$, the set $f(L)$ is called the homomorphic image of $L$. The inverse homomorphic image of a string $s$ is defined as

$f^{-1}(s) = \{ w \mid f(w) = s \}$

while the inverse homomorphic image of a language $L$ is defined as

$f^{-1}(L) = \{ s \mid f(s) \in L \}$

In general, $f(f^{-1}(L)) \neq L$, while one does have

$f(f^{-1}(L)) \subseteq L$

and

$L \subseteq f^{-1}(f(L))$

for any language $L$.

The class of regular languages is closed under homomorphisms and inverse homomorphisms. Similarly, the context-free languages are closed under homomorphisms (Note: This follows from the above-mentioned closure under arbitrary substitutions.) and inverse homomorphisms.

A string homomorphism is said to be ε-free (or e-free) if $f(a) \neq \varepsilon$ for all a in the alphabet $\Sigma$. Simple single-letter substitution ciphers are examples of (ε-free) string homomorphisms.

An example string homomorphism g_{uc} can also be obtained by defining similar to the above substitution: g_{uc}(‹a›) = ‹A›, ..., g_{uc}(‹0›) = ε, but letting g_{uc} be undefined on punctuation chars. Examples for inverse homomorphic images are

- g_{uc}^{−1}({ ‹SSS› }) = { ‹sss›, ‹sß›, ‹ßs› }, since g_{uc}(‹sss›) = g_{uc}(‹sß›) = g_{uc}(‹ßs›) = ‹SSS›, and
- g_{uc}^{−1}({ ‹A›, ‹bb› }) = { ‹a› }, since g_{uc}(‹a›) = ‹A›, while ‹bb› cannot be reached by g_{uc}.

For the latter language, g_{uc}(g_{uc}^{−1}({ ‹A›, ‹bb› })) = g_{uc}({ ‹a› }) = { ‹A› } ≠ { ‹A›, ‹bb› }. The homomorphism g_{uc} is not ε-free, since it maps e.g. ‹0› to ε.

A very simple string homomorphism example that maps each character to just a character is the conversion of an EBCDIC-encoded string to ASCII.

== String projection ==
If s is a string, and $\Sigma$ is an alphabet, the string projection of s is the string that results by removing all characters that are not in $\Sigma$. It is written as $\pi_\Sigma(s)\,$. It is formally defined by removal of characters from the right hand side:

$$\pi_\Sigma(s) = \begin{cases}
\varepsilon & \mbox{if } s=\varepsilon \mbox{ the empty string} \\
\pi_\Sigma(t) & \mbox{if } s=ta \mbox{ and } a \notin \Sigma \\
\pi_\Sigma(t)a & \mbox{if } s=ta \mbox{ and } a \in \Sigma
\end{cases}$$

Here $\varepsilon$ denotes the empty string. The projection of a string is essentially the same as a projection in relational algebra.

String projection may be promoted to the projection of a language. Given a formal language L, its projection is given by

$\pi_\Sigma (L)=\{\pi_\Sigma(s)\ \vert\ s\in L \}$

== Right and left quotient ==
The right quotient of a character a from a string s is the truncation of the character a in the string s, from the right-hand side. It is denoted as $s/a$. If the string does not have a on the right hand side, the result is the empty string. Thus:

$$(sa)/ b = \begin{cases}
s & \mbox{if } a=b \\
\varepsilon & \mbox{if } a \ne b
\end{cases}$$

The quotient of the empty string may be taken:

$$\varepsilon / a = \varepsilon$$

Similarly, given a subset $S\subset M$ of a monoid $M$, one may define the quotient subset as

$$S/a=\{s\in M\ \vert\ sa\in S\}$$

Left quotients may be defined similarly, with operations taking place on the left of a string.

Hopcroft and Ullman (1979) define the quotient L_{1}/L_{2} of the languages L_{1} and L_{2} over the same alphabet as L_{1}/L_{2} = { s | ∃t∈L_{2}. st∈L_{1} }. This is not a generalization of the above definition, since, for a string s and distinct characters a, b, Hopcroft's and Ullman's definition implies yielding {}, rather than { ε }.

The left quotient (when defined similar to Hopcroft and Ullman 1979) of a singleton language L_{1} and an arbitrary language L_{2} is known as Brzozowski derivative; if L_{2} is represented by a regular expression, so can be the left quotient.

== Syntactic relation ==
The right quotient of a subset $S\subset M$ of a monoid $M$ defines an equivalence relation, called the right syntactic relation of S. It is given by

$$\sim_S \;\,=\, \{(s,t)\in M\times M\ \vert\ S/s = S/t \}$$

The relation is clearly of finite index (has a finite number of equivalence classes) if and only if the family of right quotients is finite; that is, if

$$\{S/m\ \vert\ m\in M\}$$

is finite. In the case that M is the monoid of words over some alphabet, S is then a regular language, that is, a language that can be recognized by a finite-state automaton. This is discussed in greater detail in the article on syntactic monoids.

== Right cancellation ==
The right cancellation of a character a from a string s is the removal of the first occurrence of the character a in the string s, starting from the right-hand side. It is denoted as $s\div a$ and is recursively defined as

$$(sa)\div b = \begin{cases}
s & \mbox{if } a=b \\
(s\div b)a & \mbox{if } a \ne b
\end{cases}$$

The empty string is always cancellable:

$$\varepsilon \div a = \varepsilon$$

Clearly, right cancellation and projection commute:

$\pi_\Sigma(s)\div a = \pi_\Sigma(s \div a )$

== Prefixes ==
The prefixes of a string is the set of all prefixes to a string, with respect to a given language:

$$\operatorname{Pref}_L(s) = \{t\ \vert\ s=tu \mbox { for } t,u\in \operatorname{Alph}(L)^*\}$$

where $s\in L$.

The prefix closure of a language is

$$\operatorname{Pref} (L) = \bigcup_{s\in L} \operatorname{Pref}_L(s) = \left\{ t\ \vert\ s=tu; s\in L; t,u\in \operatorname{Alph}(L)^* \right\}$$

Example:
$L=\left\{abc\right\}\mbox{ then } \operatorname{Pref}(L)=\left\{\varepsilon, a, ab, abc\right\}$

A language is called prefix closed if $\operatorname{Pref} (L) = L$.

The prefix closure operator is idempotent:

$$\operatorname{Pref} (\operatorname{Pref} (L)) =\operatorname{Pref} (L)$$

The prefix relation is a binary relation $\sqsubseteq$ such that $s\sqsubseteq t$ if and only if $s \in \operatorname{Pref}_L(t)$. This relation is a particular example of a prefix order.

== See also ==
- Comparison of programming languages (string functions)
- Levi's lemma
- String (computer science) — definition and implementation of more basic operations on strings
