= Rational series =

In mathematics and computer science, a rational series is a generalisation of the concept of formal power series over a ring to the case when the basic algebraic structure is no longer a ring but a semiring, and the indeterminates adjoined are not assumed to commute. They can be regarded as algebraic expressions of a formal language over a finite alphabet.

== Definition ==
Let R be a semiring and A a finite alphabet.

A non-commutative polynomial over A is a finite formal sum of words over A. They form a semiring $R\langle A \rangle$.

A formal series is a R-valued function c, on the free monoid A^{*}, which may be written as

$$\sum_{w \in A^*} c(w) w .$$

The set of formal series is denoted $R\langle\langle A \rangle\rangle$ and becomes a semiring under the operations

$$c+d : w \mapsto c(w) + d(w)$$
$$c\cdot d : w \mapsto \sum_{uv = w} c(u) \cdot d(v)$$

A non-commutative polynomial thus corresponds to a function c on A^{*} of finite support.

In the case when R is a ring, then this is the Magnus ring over R.

If L is a language over A, regarded as a subset of A^{*} we can form the characteristic series of L as the formal series

$$\sum_{w \in L} w$$

corresponding to the characteristic function of L.

In $R\langle\langle A \rangle\rangle$ one can define an operation of iteration expressed as

$$S^* = \sum_{n \ge 0} S^n$$

and formalised as

$$c^*(w) = \sum_{u_1 u_2 \cdots u_n = w} c(u_1)c(u_2) \cdots c(u_n) .$$

The rational operations are the addition and multiplication of formal series, together with iteration. A rational series is a formal series obtained by rational operations from $R\langle A \rangle.$

== See also ==
- Formal power series
- Rational language
- Rational set
- Hahn series (Malcev–Neumann series)
- Weighted automaton
