= Recognizable set =

In computer science, more precisely in automata theory, a recognizable set of a monoid is a subset that can be distinguished by some homomorphism to a finite monoid. Recognizable sets are useful in automata theory, formal languages and algebra.

This notion is different from the notion of recognizable language. Indeed, the term "recognizable" has a different meaning in computability theory.

== Definition ==
Let $N$ be a monoid, a subset $S\subseteq N$ is recognized by a monoid $M$ if there exists a homomorphism $\phi$ from $N$ to $M$ such that $S=\phi^{-1}(\phi(S))$, and recognizable if it is recognized by some finite monoid. This means that there exists a subset $T$ of $M$ (not necessarily a submonoid of $M$) such that the image of $S$ is in $T$ and the image of $N \setminus S$ is in $M \setminus T$.

== Example ==
Let $A$ be an alphabet: the set $A^*$ of words over $A$ is a monoid, the free monoid on $A$. The recognizable subsets of $A^*$ are precisely the regular languages. Indeed, such a language is recognized by the transition monoid of any automaton that recognizes the language.

The recognizable subsets of $\mathbb N$ are the ultimately periodic sets of integers.

== Properties ==
A subset of $N$ is recognizable if and only if its syntactic monoid is finite.

The set $\mathrm{REC}(N)$ of recognizable subsets of $N$ is closed under:

- union
- intersection
- complement
- right and left quotient

Mezei's theorem states that if $M$ is the product of the monoids $M_1, \dots, M_n$, then a subset of $M$ is recognizable if and only if it is a finite union of subsets of the form $R_1 \times \cdots \times R_n$, where each $R_i$ is a recognizable subset of $M_i$. For instance, the subset $\{1\}$ of $\mathbb N$ is rational and hence recognizable, since $\mathbb N$ is a free monoid. It follows that the subset $S=\{(1,1)\}$ of $\mathbb N^2$ is recognizable.

McKnight's theorem states that if $N$ is finitely generated then its recognizable subsets are rational subsets. This is not true in general, since the whole $N$ is always recognizable but it is not rational if $N$ is infinitely generated.

Conversely, a rational subset may not be recognizable, even if $N$ is finitely generated. In fact, even a finite subset of $N$ is not necessarily recognizable. For instance, the set $\{0\}$ is not a recognizable subset of $(\mathbb Z, +)$. Indeed, if a homomorphism $\phi$ from $\mathbb Z$ to $M$ satisfies $\{0\}=\phi^{-1}(\phi(\{0\}))$, then $\phi$ is an injective function; hence $M$ is infinite.

Also, in general, $\mathrm{REC}(N)$ is not closed under Kleene star. For instance, the set $S=\{(1,1)\}$ is a recognizable subset of $\mathbb N^2$, but $S^*=\{(n, n)\mid n\in \mathbb N\}$ is not recognizable. Indeed, its syntactic monoid is infinite.

The intersection of a rational subset and of a recognizable subset is rational.

Recognizable sets are closed under inverse of homomorphisms. I.e. if $N$ and $M$ are monoids and $\phi:N\rightarrow M$ is a homomorphism then if $S\in\mathrm{REC}(M)$ then $\phi^{-1}(S)=\{x\mid \phi(x)\in S\}\in\mathrm{REC}(N)$.

For finite groups the following result of Anissimov and Seifert is well known: a subgroup H of a finitely generated group G is recognizable if and only if H has finite index in G. In contrast, H is rational if and only if H is finitely generated.

== See also ==
- Rational set
- Rational monoid
