= Rational monoid =

Type of algebraic structure

In mathematics, a rational monoid is a monoid for which each element can be represented in a "normal form" that can be computed by a finite transducer: multiplication in such a monoid is easy in the sense that it can be described by a rational function.

== Definition ==
Let M be a monoid. Consider a pair (A,L) where A is a finite subset of M that generates M as a monoid, and L is a language on A (that is, a subset of the set of all strings A^{∗}). Let φ be the map from the free monoid A^{∗} to M given by evaluating a string as a product in M. We say that L is a rational cross-section if φ induces a bijection between L and M. We say that (A,L) is a rational structure for M if in addition the kernel of φ, viewed as a subset of the product monoid A^{∗} × A^{∗} is a rational set.

A quasi-rational monoid is one for which L is a rational relation: a rational monoid is one for which there is also a rational function cross-section of L. Since L is a subset of a free monoid, Kleene's theorem holds and a rational function is just one that can be instantiated by a finite state transducer.

== Examples ==
- A finite monoid is rational.
- A group is a rational monoid if and only if it is finite.
- A finitely-generated free monoid is rational.
- The monoid M4 generated by the set {0,e, a,b, x,y} subject to relations in which e is the identity, 0 is an absorbing element, each of a and b commutes with each of x and y and ax = bx, ay = by = bby, xx = xy = yx = yy = 0 is rational, but not automatic.
- The Fibonacci monoid, the quotient of the free monoid on two generators {a,b}^{∗} by the congruence aab = bba, is rational.

== Properties ==
Kleene's theorem holds for rational monoids: that is, a subset is a recognisable set if and only if it is a rational set.

A rational monoid is not necessarily automatic, and vice versa. However, a rational monoid is asynchronously automatic and hyperbolic.

A rational monoid is a regulator monoid and a quasi-rational monoid: each of these implies that it is a Kleene monoid, that is, a monoid in which Kleene's theorem holds.

=== Green's relations ===
The Green's relations for a rational monoid satisfy D = J.
