= Janusz Brzozowski (computer scientist) =

Polish-Canadian computer scientist (1935–2019)

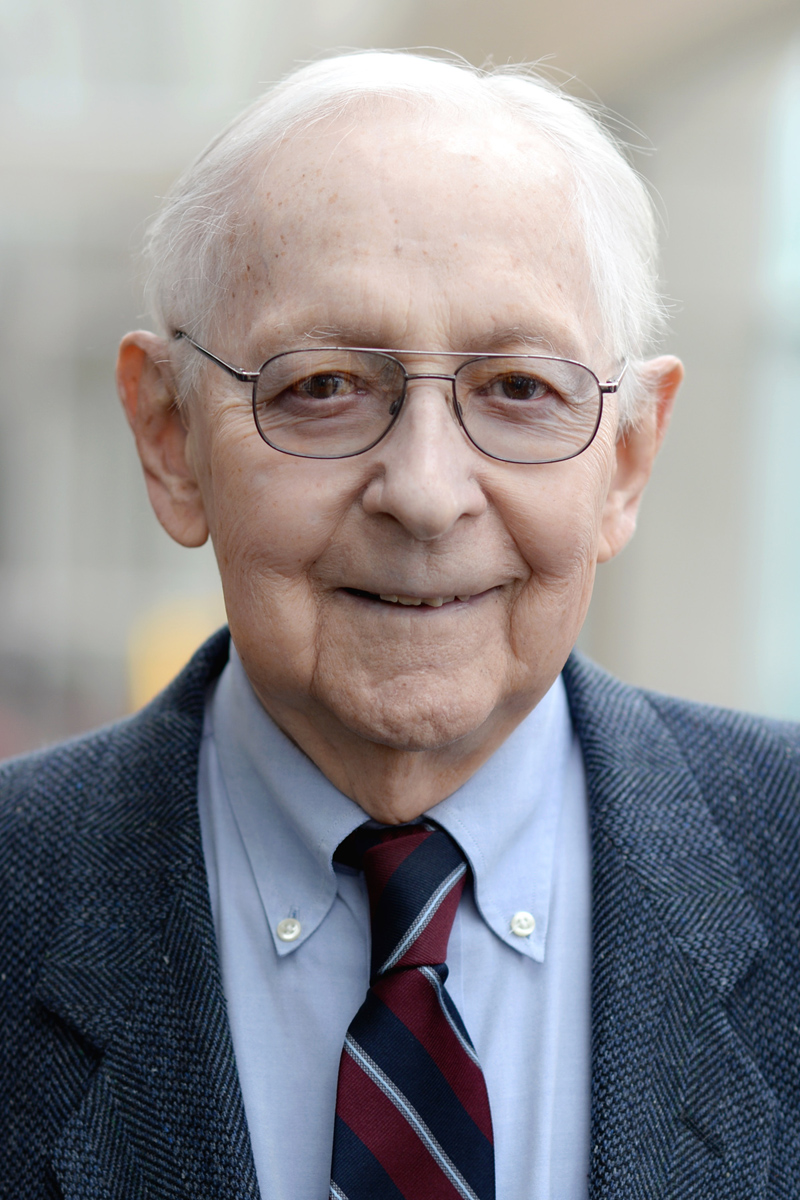
- Brzozowski in 2018
- Born: May 10, 1935; Warsaw, Poland
- Died: October 24, 2019 (aged 84); Lisaard House, Cambridge, Ontario, Canada
- Education: Princeton University
- Known for: Brzozowski derivative Brzozowski's algorithm
- Scientific career
- Fields: Computer science
- Thesis: Regular Expression Techniques for Sequential Circuits (1962)
- Doctoral advisor: Edward J. McCluskey

Janusz (John) Antoni Brzozowski (May 10, 1935 – October 24, 2019) was a Polish-Canadian computer scientist and Distinguished Professor Emeritus at the University of Waterloo's David R. Cheriton School of Computer Science.

In 1962, Brzozowski earned his PhD in the field of electrical engineering at Princeton University under Edward J. McCluskey. The topic of the thesis was Regular Expression Techniques for Sequential Circuits. From 1967 to 1996 he was Professor at the University of Waterloo. He is known for his contributions to mathematical logic, circuit theory, and automata theory.

== Achievements in research ==
Brzozowski worked on regular expressions and on syntactic semigroups of formal languages. The result was Characterizations of locally testable events written together with Imre Simon, which had a similar impact on the development of the algebraic theory of formal languages as Marcel-Paul Schützenberger's characterization of the star-free languages.

In the area, today at least four concepts bear Brzozowski's name in honour of his contributions: The first is the Brzozowski's conjecture about the regularity of noncounting classes. Second, Brzozowski's algorithm, a conceptually simple algorithm for performing DFA minimization. Third, the Brzozowski derivative of a formal language or of a generalised regular expression. Fourth, Eilenberg's reference work on automata theory has a chapter devoted to the so-called Brzozowski hierarchy inside the star-free languages, also known as dot-depth hierarchy. Notably, Brzozowski was not only co-author of the paper that defined the dot-depth hierarchy and raised the question whether this hierarchy is strict, he later also was co-author of the paper resolving that problem after roughly ten years. The Brzozowski hierarchy gained further importance after Wolfgang Thomas discovered a relation between the algebraic concept of dot-depth and the alternation depth of quantifiers in first-order logic via Ehrenfeucht–Fraïssé games.

He received the following academic awards and honours:

- NSERC Scientific Exchange Award to France (1974–1975)
- Japan Society for the Promotion of Science Research Fellowship (1984)
- Computing Research Association Certificate of Appreciation for outstanding contributions and service as a member of the CRA Board of Directors (1992)
- Distinguished Professor Emeritus, University of Waterloo, Canada (1996)
- Medal of Merit, Catholic University of Lublin, Poland (2001)
- IBM Canada Canadian Pioneer in Computing (2005)
- The Role of Theory in Computer Science, a one-day conference in honour of John Brzozowski's 80th birthday (2015)
- The Role of Theory in Computer Science: Essays Dedicated to Janusz Brzozowski, World Scientific (2017)
- Lifetime Achievement Award, Computer Science Canada/Informatique Canada (CS-CAN/INFO-CAN) (2016)
- CIAA 2017 Sheng Yu Award for Best Paper for Complexity of Proper Prefix-Convex Regular Languages by J. Brzozowski and C. Sinnamon
- CIAA 2018 Sheng Yu Award for Best Paper for State Complexity of Overlap Assembly by J. Brzozowski, L. Kari, B. Li, M. Szykula

== Research papers ==
- J. A. Brzozowski: Derivatives of regular expressions, Journal of the ACM 11(4): 481–494 (1964)
- J. A. Brzozowski, I. Simon: Characterizations of Locally Testable Events, FOCS 1971, pp. 166–176
- R. S. Cohen, J. A. Brzozowski: Dot-Depth of Star-Free Events. Journal of Computer and System Sciences 5(1): 1–16 (1971)
- J. A. Brzozowski, R. Knast: The Dot-Depth Hierarchy of Star-Free Languages is Infinite. Journal of Computer and System Sciences 16(1): 37–55 (1978)

== Books ==
- J. A. Brzozowski, M. Yoeli: Digital Networks. Prentice–Hall, 1976
- J. A. Brzozowski, C.-J. H. Seger: Asynchronous Circuits. Springer-Verlag, 1995
