= Recognizable (disambiguation) =

Recognizable is to be able to recall information from the past.

Recognizable may also refer to:

- Recognizable language in calculability, language accepted by Turing Machine
- Recognizable set in automata theory, some subset of monoids
