= Quotient of a formal language =

In mathematics and computer science, the right quotient (or simply quotient) of a language $L_1$ with respect to language $L_2$ is the language consisting of strings $w$ such that $wx$ is in $L_1$ for some string $x$ in $L_2$, where $L_1$ and $L_2$ are defined on the same alphabet $\Sigma$. Formally:

$$L_1 / L_2 = \{w \in \Sigma^* \mid wL_2 \cap L_1 \neq \varnothing\} = \{w \in \Sigma^* \mid \exists x \in L_2 \ \colon\ wx \in L_1\}$$

where $\Sigma^*$ is the Kleene star on $\Sigma$, $wL_2$ is the language formed by concatenating $w$ with each element of $L_2$, and $\varnothing$ is the empty set.

In other words, for all strings in $L_1$ that have a suffix in $L_2$, the suffix (right part of the string) is removed.

Similarly, the left quotient of $L_1$ with respect to $L_2$ is the language consisting of strings $w$ such that $xw$ is in $L_1$ for some string $x$ in $L_2$. Formally:

$$L_2 \backslash L_1 = \{w \in \Sigma^* \mid L_2w \cap L_1 \neq \varnothing\} = \{w \in \Sigma^* \mid \exists x\in L_2 \ \colon\ xw \in L_1\}$$

In other words, for all strings in $L_1$ that have a prefix in $L_2$, the prefix (left part of the string) is removed.

Note that the operands of $\backslash$ are in reverse order, so that $L_2$ precedes $L_1$.

The right and left quotients of $L_1$ with respect to $L_2$ may also be written as $L_1 L_2^{-1}$ and $L_2^{-1} L_1$ respectively.

== Example ==
Consider
$$L_1 = \{ a^n b^n c^n \mid n \ge 0 \}$$
and
$$L_2 = \{ b^i c^j \mid i,j \ge 0 \}.$$

If an element of $L_1$ is split into two parts, then the right part will be in $L_2$ if and only if the split occurs somewhere after the final $a$. Assuming this is the case, if the split occurs before the first $c$ then $0 \le i \le n$ and $j=n$, otherwise $i=0$ and $0 \le j \le n$. For instance:

$aa \mid bbcc \ \ (n=2, i=j=2)$

$aaab \mid bbccc \ \ (n=3, i=2, j=3)$

$aabbcc \mid \epsilon \ \ (n=2, i=j=0)$

where $\epsilon$ is the empty string.

Thus, the left part will be either $a^n b^{n-i}$ or $a^n b^n c^{n-j}$ $(0 \le i,j \le n$), and $L_1 / L_2$ can be written as:

$$\{\ a^p b^q c^r \ \mid\ (p \ge q \text{ and } r = 0) \ \ \text{or} \ \  p = q \ge r \ \ ; \ \ p, q, r \ge 0 \ \}.$$

== Basic properties ==
If $L, L_1, L_2$ are languages over the same alphabet then:

$$(L_1 \cup L_2) / L \ = \ L_1 / L \ \cup \ L_2 / L$$
$$(L_1 \cup L_2) \backslash L \ = \ L_1 \backslash L \ \cup \ L_2 \backslash L$$

$$(L_1 \cap L_2) / L \ \subseteq \ L_1 / L \ \cap \ L_2 / L$$
$$(L_1 \cap L_2) \backslash L \ \subseteq \ L_1 \backslash L \ \cap \ L_2 \backslash L$$

$$L \backslash (L_1 \cup L_2) \ = \ L \backslash L_1 \ \cup \ L \backslash L_2$$
$$L \backslash (L_1 \cap L_2) \ \subseteq \ L \backslash L_1 \ \cap \ L \backslash L_2$$

$$L_1 / L - L_2 / L \ \subseteq \ (L_1 - L_2) / L$$
$$L \backslash L_1 - L \backslash L_2 \ \subseteq \ L \backslash (L_1 - L_2)$$

=== Example proof ===
As an example, the third property is proved as follows:

If $w \in (L_1 \cap L_2) / L$, there exists $x \in L$ such that $wx \in L_1 \cap L_2$. Since then $wx \in L_1$ and $wx \in L_2$, it must be that $w \in L_1 / L \cap L_2 / L$. Conversely, let $w \in L_1 / L$ and $w \in L_2 / L$, then there exists $x_1, x_2 \in L$ such that $wx_1 \in L_1$ and $wx_2 \in L_2$ (given $w$, if $L_1 \neq L_2$ then $x_1,x_2$ may differ). Now $wx_1 \in L_1 \cap \ L_2$ and $wx_2 \in L_1 \cap \ L_2$ only if $x_1 = x_2$, hence $(L_1 \cap L_2) / L \subseteq L_1 / L \cap L_2 / L$.

For instance, let $L_1 = \{aab, bbb\},$ $L_2 = \{abb, bbb\},$ $L = \{ab, bb\}$.

Then $L_1 \cap L_2 = \{bbb\}$, hence $(L_1 \cap L_2) / L = \{b\}$.

Also $L_1 / L = \{a, b\}$ and $L_2 / L = \{a, b\}$, hence $L_1 / L \cap L_2 / L = \{a, b\}$.

== Relationship between right and left quotients ==
The right and left quotients of languages $L_1$ and $L_2$ are related through the language reversals $L_1^R$ and $L_2^R$ by the equalities:

$$L_1 / L_2 = (L_2^R \backslash L_1^R)^R$$
$$L_2 \backslash L_1 = (L_1^R / L_2^R)^R$$

=== Proof ===
To prove the first equality, let $w \in L_1 / L_2$. Then there exists $x \in L_2$ such that $wx \in L_1$. Therefore, there must exist $y \in L_2^R$ such that $yw^R \in L_1^R$, hence by definition $w^R \in L_2^R \backslash L_1^R$. It follows that $w \in (L_2^R \backslash L_1^R)^R$, and so $L_1 / L_2 = (L_2^R \backslash L_1^R)^R$.

The second equality is proved in a similar manner.

== Other properties ==
Some common closure properties of the quotient operation include:

- The quotient of a regular language with any other language is regular.
- The quotient of a context free language with a regular language is context free.
- The quotient of two context free languages can be any recursively enumerable language.
- The quotient of two recursively enumerable languages is recursively enumerable.

These closure properties hold for both left and right quotients.

== See also ==
- Brzozowski derivative
