= Prefix grammar =

In theoretical computer science and formal language theory, a prefix grammar is a type of string rewriting system, consisting of a set of string rewriting rules, and similar to a formal grammar or a semi-Thue system. What is specific about prefix grammars is not the shape of their rules, but the way in which they are applied: only prefixes are rewritten. The prefix grammars describe exactly all regular languages.

== Formal definition ==
A prefix grammar G is a 3-tuple, (Σ, S, P), where

- Σ is a finite alphabet
- S is a finite set of base strings over Σ
- P is a finite set of production rules of the form u → v where u and v are strings over Σ

For strings x, y, we write x →_{G} y (and say: G can derive y from x in one step) if there are strings u, v, w such that $x = vu, y = wu$, and v → w is in P. Note that →_{G} is a binary relation on the strings of Σ.

The language of G, denoted $L(G)$, is the set of strings derivable from S in zero or more steps: formally, the set of strings w such that for some s in S, s R w, where R is the transitive closure of →_{G}.

== Example ==
The prefix grammar

- Σ = {0, 1}
- S = {01, 10}
- P = {0 → 010, 10 → 100}

describes the language defined by the regular expression

$$01(01)^* \cup 100^*$$

== See also ==
- Regular grammar
