= Imre Simon =

Brazilian mathematician (1943–2009)

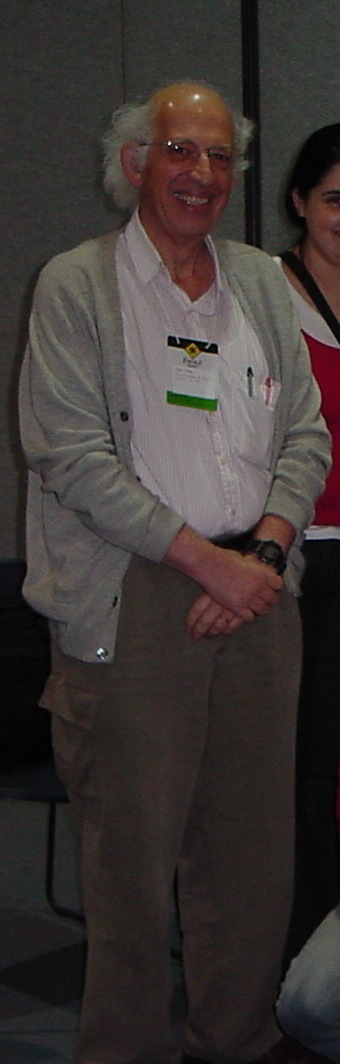
- Born: 14 August 1943; Budapest, Hungary
- Died: 13 August 2009 (aged 65); São Paulo, Brazil
- Scientific career
- Doctoral advisor: Janusz Brzozowski

Imre Simon (August 14, 1943 – August 13, 2009) was a Hungarian-born Brazilian mathematician and computer scientist.

His research mainly focused on theoretical computer science, automata theory, and tropical mathematics, a subject he founded, and which was so named because he lived in Brazil. He was a professor of mathematics at the University of São Paulo in Brazil. In 2005, the journal RAIRO-ITA published an issue dedicated to his life and work. He was also actively interested in questions about the impact of computing and information networks on human collaboration and the production of intellectual commons, and was an enthusiastic advocate for open collaborative information systems, of which Wikipedia is an example.

== Biography ==
Simon came to Brazil with his parents after the Hungarian Revolution of 1956. He studied electrical engineering at the University of São Paulo, received his diploma in 1966, and his Ph.D. at the University of Waterloo in 1972, under Janusz Brzozowski with the thesis: Hierarchies of Events with Dot-Depth One.

He died of lung cancer in São Paulo, Brazil on August 13, 2009, one day before his 66th birthday.

== Career ==
Simon was a Full Professor of the Instituto de Matemática e Estatística's Department of Computer Science and received the Emeritus title, post-mortem.
