= Paul Levi (picture framer) =

German picture framer

Paul Levi (22 August 1919 – 5 August 2008) was a German-born picture framer.

== Background ==
Levi played a pivotal role in the transformation of picture framing in the decades following the Second World War and created a wide range of frames based on historic styles for public and private patrons, including a number of the greatest art collections of Europe and North America.

== Early life ==
Levi was born in Leipzig on 22 August 1919, the only son of the mathematician Friedrich Levi. In 1935 his father, who was of Jewish ancestry, was prevented from teaching in Germany and left for India. Levi was sent to Blundell's School in Devon where he developed his interest in carving and architecture, winning a BBC schools' prize for sculpture.

As a German national Levi was interned on the Isle of Man following the German invasion of the Netherlands in 1940. Whilst interned he became friendly with others in the same situation, including Johannes Wilde (later deputy director of the Courtauld Institute), Max Perutz (the molecular biologist who was awarded the Nobel Prize for Chemistry in 1962) and the mathematician Sir Hermann Bondi.

He was subsequently sent to Canada before being returned to England and set to work as an agricultural labourer in East Anglia.

== Post war ==
After the war Levi met the artist and frame-maker F.A. Pollak and subsequently began to collect examples of antique frames. He later recognised that 16th-century Dutch frames could be dated precisely from the profiles of their mouldings when compared to a sequence of fixed points provided by dated paintings retaining their original frames. This systematic approach was to form the basis for Levi's subsequent career, and in 1950 he set up his own workshop.

The intellectual approach adopted by Levi was unusual at that time, given that the Modern movement was increasingly dominating public museums and galleries (for example Franco Albini's 1950 decision to remove the frames from the Old Master paintings in the Palazzo Bianco and display them against white walls). However, collectors such as Antoine Seilern and Sir Brinsley Ford kept to traditional values and employed Levi regularly. Few public collections followed their examples until the late 1970s.

It was Levi who first reconstructed the machine needed to recreate the black ripple moulding frames for reframing of Dutch 17th-century paintings. One of Levi's greatest successes after his retirement, and in collaboration with William Adair, was the identification of the 11 paintings needed to reassemble Filippo Mazzola’s polyptych that formed the altarpiece in the church of S Maria delle Grazie at Cortemaggiore. Levi had purchased the frame in 1967 and his role in and generosity in donating it were recognised in 2003 when he was awarded the rank of Cavaliere.

Levi married Paula Fuchs in 1951, he had three sons and two daughters and died in Reading.

== Sources ==
- Obituary - Paul Levi, The Independent, 31 December 2008
- Part 1, A 500-year-old frame returns home, William B Adair, Picture Framing Magazine, August 2003
- Part 2, A 500-year-old frame returns home, William B Adair, Picture Framing Magazine, September 2003
- Adams, Lorraine, 'Restoration leads to Historical Reunion', The Washington Post, 24 October 2002
