= Gennady Makanin =

Russian mathematician (1938–2017)

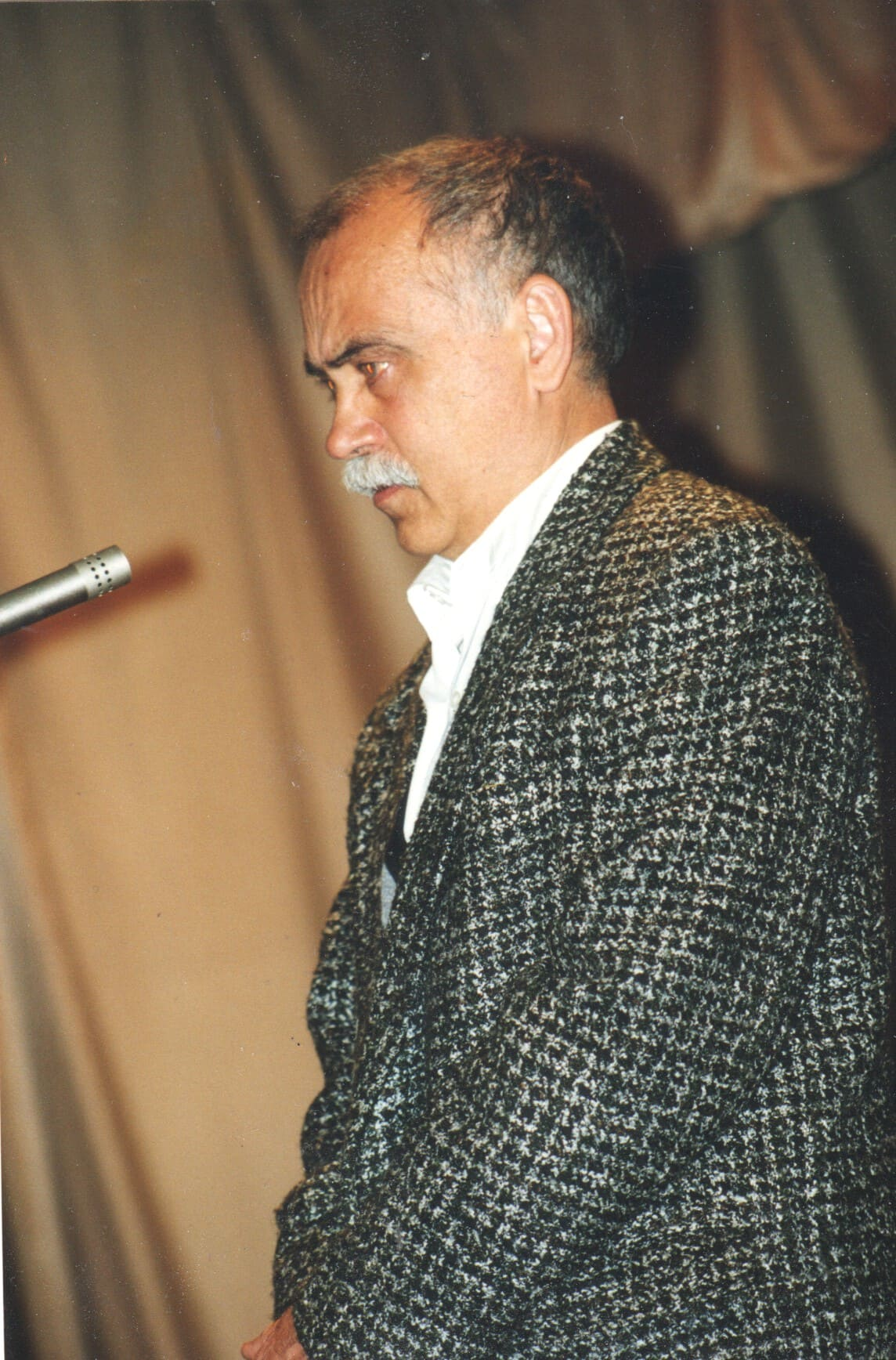
- Gennady Semenovich Makanin
- Born: Gennady Semenovich Makanin; May 19, 1938
- Died: 2017
- Education: Moscow State University
- Known for: Makanin's algorithm (1977); Makanin-Razborov algorithm Makanin-Razborov diagrams
- Scientific career
- Fields: mathematics
- Workplaces: Steklov Institute of Mathematics

Gennady (or Gennadii or Gennadiy) Semenovich Makanin (1938–2017) was a Russian mathematician, awarded the 2010 I. M. Vinogradov Prize for a series of papers on the problem of algorithmically recognizing the solvability of arbitrary equations in free groups and semigroups.

== Education and career ==
At Moscow State University he received his undergraduate degree and in 1967 his Russian Candidate of Sciences degree (PhD). His dissertation К проблеме тождества в конечно-определённых группах и полугруппах (On the identity problem in finitely-presented groups and semigroups) was supervised by Andrey Markov Jr. and Sergei Adian.

Makanin spent his career (since 1966) working at the Steklov Institute of Mathematics (since 2013 as a freelance employee). From the Steklov Institute of Mathematics he received in 1977 his Russian Doctor of Sciences degree (similar to habilitation) with dissertation Проблема разрешимости уравнений в свободной полугруппе (The problem of solvability of equations in a free semigroup). On the basis of his 1977 dissertation he was an invited speaker at the 1978 International Congress of Mathematicians in Helsinki.

He gained international recognition for his research on combinatorial group theory and algorithmic problems in the theory of semigroups. Zlil Sela, Eliyahu Rips, and others have made important applications of Makanin-Razborov diagrams to geometric group theory.

In 1982 Makanin published a complete solution (an algorithm with proof of validity) to the problem of recognizing the solvability of equations in a free group. An English translation was published in 1983. In 1984 (followed by English translation in 1985) he published a proof, using techniques similar to those in his 1982 paper, of the decidability, for any free group, of two different formal theories generated by that free group.

== Remarks on Makanin's research ==
Martin Davis and Julia Robinson worked unsuccessfully on the problem which was eventually solved in 1977 by Makanin:

We worked together on a problem on which we didn’t get anywhere. We were trying to prove the unsolvability of the decision problem for word equations. It turned out that we wouldn’t have been able to do that because the problem is solvable. Makanin solved it positively. That had a curious relationship to Hilbert’s Tenth Problem, because some of the Russians were interested in proving it unsolvable because its unsolvability would have been a way to get the unsolvability of Hilbert’s Tenth Problem, without proving my conjecture, which they thought was likely false. But in fact, it turned out to be on the other side of the line.

Yuri Matiyasevich published a generalization of what he called the "celebrated theorem of G. S. Makanin about decidability of word equations".

== Selected publications ==
- Makanin, G. S. (1977). "The Problem of Solvability of Equations in a Free Semigroup". Mathematics of the USSR-Sbornik. 32 (2): 129–198. Bibcode:1977SbMat..32..129M. doi:10.1070/SM1977v032n02ABEH002376.
- —— (1982). "Уравнения в свободной группе (Equations in a free group)". Известия АН СССР. Серия математика. 46 (6): 1199–1273.
- —— (1984). "Универсальная теория и позитивная теория свободной группы (Universal theory and positive theory of the free group)". Известия АН СССР. Серия математика. 48 (4): 735–749.
- —— (1992). "Investigations on equations in a free group". Word Equations and Related Topics. Lecture Notes in Computer Science. Vol. 572. pp. 1–11. doi:10.1007/3-540-55124-7_1. ISBN 978-3-540-55124-9.
- —— (1993). "On general solution of equations in a free semigroup". Word Equations and Related Topics. Lecture Notes in Computer Science. Vol. 677. pp. 1–5. doi:10.1007/3-540-56730-5_27. ISBN 978-3-540-56730-1.
- —— (1996). "Multiplication of natural number parameters and equations in a free semigroup". Transactions of the American Mathematical Society. 348 (12): 4813–4824. doi:10.1090/S0002-9947-96-01670-4. ISSN 0002-9947.
- ——; Abdulrab, H.; Goralcik, P. (1997). "Functions for the general solution of parametric word equations". Logical Foundations of Computer Science. Lecture Notes in Computer Science. Vol. 1234. pp. 189–202. doi:10.1007/3-540-63045-7_20. ISBN 978-3-540-63045-6.
- ——; Makanina, Tatiana A. (1999). "Functions for parametrization of solutions of an equation in a free monoid". Transactions of the American Mathematical Society. 352 (1): 1–54. doi:10.1090/S0002-9947-99-02287-4. ISSN 0002-9947.
- ——; Makanina, Tatiana A. (2000). "Parametrisation of solutions of parametric equation in free monoid". Theoretical Computer Science. 242 (1–2): 403–475. doi:10.1016/S0304-3975(00)00004-9.
