= Friedrich Wilhelm Levi =

German mathematician

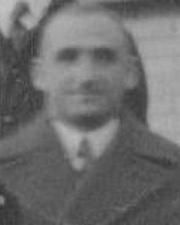
Friedrich Wilhelm Levi (1930).

Friedrich Wilhelm Daniel Levi (February 6, 1888 – January 1, 1966) was a German mathematician known for his work in abstract algebra, especially torsion-free abelian groups. He also worked in geometry, topology, set theory, and analysis.

== Early life and education ==
Levi was born to Georg Levi and Emma Blum in Mulhouse in Alsace-Lorraine, then part of the German Empire. He received his Ph.D. in 1911 under Heinrich Martin Weber at the University of Strasbourg.

== Career ==
Levi served his mandatory military service in the German Army in 1906–1907, and was called up again serving in the artillery during World War I, 1914–18. Awarded the Iron Cross, he was discharged as a lieutenant. In 1917, he married Barbara Fitting, with whom he eventually had three children (Paul Levi, Charlotte, and Suzanne). He taught at the University of Leipzig from 1920 to 1935, when the Nazi government dismissed him because of his Jewish ancestry. Friedrich and Barbara moved to Calcutta, India.

In 1935 he accepted an offer as head of the Mathematics Department at the University of Calcutta. He introduced the Levi graph in 1940 at a series of lectures on finite geometry. He contributed to the understanding of combinatorics on words when he articulated the Levi lemma in an article for the Calcutta Mathematical Society. In 1948, Levi became professor of mathematics at Tata Institute of Fundamental Research in Mumbai, India. According to Raghavan Narasimhan, Levi had an important influence on the development of 20th century mathematics in India, especially by introducing modern algebra at the University of Calcutta.

In 1952, he returned to Germany and was a professor at the Free University of Berlin and later University of Freiburg. He died in Freiburg on the first day of 1966. A bibliography of 70 works in mathematics by Levi is included in the 1991 tribute by László Fuchs and Rüdiger Göbel.

== Selected publications ==
- Abelsche Gruppen mit abzählbaren Elementen. B. G. Teubner, Leipzig [1919]. (Habilitationsschrift, Universität Leipzig)
- Geometrische Konfigurationen. Hirzel, Leipzig 1929.
- Reinhold Baer and Friedrich Levi: Ränder topologischer Räume. Hirzel, Leipzig 1930.
- On the fundamentals of analysis. Six lectures delivered in February 1938 at the University of Calcutta. University of Calcutta, Calcutta 1939.
- F. W. Levi and R. N. Sen: Plane geometry. Calcutta 1939.
- Finite geometrical systems. Six public lectures delivered in February 1940 at the University of Calcutta. University of Calcutta, Calcutta 1942.
- Algebra. University of Calcutta, Calcutta 1942.
