= Conference on Implementation and Application of Automata =

- Abbreviation: CIAA (formerly WIA)
- Discipline: Automata theory and formal languages

Publication details
- Publisher: Springer LNCS
- History: 1996–
- Frequency: annual (since 1996)

CIAA, the International Conference on Implementation and Application of Automata is an annual academic conference in the field of computer science. Its purpose is to bring together members of the academic, research, and industrial community who have an interest in the theory, implementation, and application of automata and related structures. There, the conference concerns research on all aspects of implementation and application of automata and related structures, including theoretical aspects. In 2000, the conference grew out of the Workshop on Implementation of Automata (WIA).

Like most theoretical computer science conferences its contributions are strongly peer-reviewed; the articles appear in proceedings published in Springer Lecture Notes in Computer Science. Extended versions of selected papers of each year's conference alternatingly appear in the journals Theoretical Computer Science and International Journal of Foundations of Computer Science. Every year a best paper award is presented.

== Topics ==
Since the focus of the conference is on applied theory, contributions usually come from a widespread range of application domains. Typical topics of the conference include, among others, the following, as they relate to automata:

- Bio-inspired computing
- Complexity of automata operations, state complexity
- Compilers
- Computer-aided verification, model checking
- Concurrency
- Data and image compression
- Design and architecture of automata software
- Document engineering
- Natural language processing
- Pattern matching
- Teaching of automata theory
- Text processing
- Techniques for graphical display of automata

== History ==
The CIAA conference series was founded by Darrell Raymond and Derick Wood. Since 2013, the Steering committee is chaired by Kai Salomaa.

Event	Location	PC chairs	Proceedings	Special issue
1st WIA 1996	London, Ontario, Canada	Darrell R. Raymond; Derick Wood; Sheng Yu	LNCS 1260	
2nd WIA 1997	London, Ontario, Canada	Derick Wood; Sheng Yu	LNCS 1436	Theoretical Computer Science 231(1), 2000
3rd WIA 1998	Rouen, France	Jean-Marc Champarnaud; Denis Maurel; Djelloul Ziadi	LNCS 1660	Theoretical Computer Science 267(1-2), 2001
4th WIA 1999	Potsdam, Germany	Oliver Boldt; Helmut Jürgensen	LNCS 2214	
5th CIAA 2000	London, Ontario, Canada	Sheng Yu; Andrei Paun	LNCS 2088	International Journal of Foundations of Computer Science 13(1), 2002
6th CIAA 2001	Pretoria, South Africa	Bruce W. Watson, Derick Wood	LNCS 2494	Theoretical Computer Science 313(1), 2004
7th CIAA 2002	Tours, France	Jean-Marc Champarnaud; Denis Maurel	LNCS 2608	International Journal of Foundations of Computer Science 14(6), 2003
8th CIAA 2003	Santa Barbara, USA	Oscar H. Ibarra; Zhe Dang	LNCS 2759	Theoretical Computer Science 328(1-2), 2004
9th CIAA 2004	Kingston, Ontario, Canada	Kai Salomaa; Sheng Yu	LNCS 3317	International Journal of Foundations of Computer Science 16(3), 2005
10th CIAA 2005	Sophia Antipolis, France	Jacques Farré; Igor Litovsky	LNCS 3845	Theoretical Computer Science 363(2), 2006
11th CIAA 2006	Taipei, Taiwan	Oscar H. Ibarra; Hsu-Chun Yen	LNCS 4094	International Journal of Foundations of Computer Science 18(4), 2007
12th CIAA 2007	Prague, Czech Republic	Jan Holub; Bořivoj Melichar	LNCS 4783	Theoretical Computer Science 410(37), 2009
13th CIAA 2008	San Francisco, California, USA	Oscar H. Ibarra; Bala Ravikumar	LNCS 5148	International Journal of Foundations of Computer Science 20(4), 2009
14th CIAA 2009	Sydney, Australia	Sebastian Maneth	LNCS 5642	Theoretical Computer Science 411(38-39), 2010
15th CIAA 2010	Winnipeg, Manitoba, Canada	Michael Domaratzki; Kai Salomaa	LNCS 6482	International Journal of Foundations of Computer Science 22(8), 2011
16th CIAA 2011	Blois, France	Béatrice Bouchou-Markhoff; Jean-Marc Champarnaud; Denis Maurel	LNCS 6807	Theoretical Computer Science 450, 2012
17th CIAA 2012	Porto, Portugal	Nelma Moreira; Rogério Reis	LNCS 7381	International Journal of Foundations of Computer Science 24(6), 2013
18th CIAA 2013	Halifax, Nova Scotia, Canada	Stavros Konstantinidis	LNCS 7982	Theoretical Computer Science 578, 2015
19th CIAA 2014	Giessen, Germany	Markus Holzer; Martin Kutrib	LNCS 8587	International Journal of Foundations of Computer Science 26(7), 2015
20th CIAA 2015	Umeå, Sweden	Frank Drewes	LNCS 9223	Theoretical Computer Science 679, 2017
21st CIAA 2016	Seoul, South Korea	Yo-Sub Han; Kai Salomaa	LNCS 9705	International Journal of Foundations of Computer Science 28(5), 2017
22nd CIAA 2017	Paris, France	Arnaud Carayol; Cyril Nicaud	LNCS 10329	Theoretical Computer Science 787, 2019
23rd CIAA 2018	Charlottetwon, Prince Edward Island, Canada	Cezar Câmpeanu	LNCS 10977	International Journal of Foundations of Computer Science 31(8), 2020
24th CIAA 2019	Košice, Slovakia	Galina Jirásková	LNCS 11601	Theoretical Computer Science, to appear.
25th CIAA 2020	Loughborough, United Kingdom (cancelled)	Manfred Kufleitner; Daniel Reidenbach	N/A	N/A

== See also ==
- List of computer science conferences
