= Derick Wood =

English computer scientist

Derick Wood (1940–2010) was an English computer scientist who worked for many years as a professor of computer science in Canada and Hong Kong. He was known for his research in automata theory and formal languages, much of which he published in collaboration with Hermann Maurer and Arto Salomaa, and also for his work in computational geometry.

Wood was born in 1940 in Lancashire, and educated at the University of Leeds. He earned his PhD from Leeds in 1968 under the supervision of Mike Wells. After postdoctoral studies at the Courant Institute of Mathematical Sciences of New York University, he took his first faculty position at McMaster University in Ontario, Canada. Before joining the Hong Kong University of Science and Technology (HKUST) in 1995, Wood also taught at the University of Waterloo and the University of Western Ontario. He became a chair professor at HKUST in 2006. He died on 4 October 2010 in Sunnyside Long-Term Care, Kitchener, where he moved after his retirement.

Wood together with Darrell Raymond founded the Workshop on Implementing Automata, later to become the International Conference on Implementation and Application of Automata (CIAA). The Journal of Universal Computer Science published a special issue in honor of his 70th birthday. The University of Waterloo continues to offer an annual graduate scholarship in his memory.
