= DCFS =

The following concepts can be abbreviated DCFS

- Department of Children and Family Services, the name of a governmental agency in some states in the United States
- Department of Children and Family Services (Los Angeles County)
- Descriptional Complexity of Formal Systems, a computer science conference

== See also ==
- Department for Children, Schools and Families (DCSF), British government department responsible for all issues affecting people up to the age of 19 including child protection and education
