= Giovanni Pighizzini =

Italian theoretical computer scientist

- Education: University of Milan
- Known for: state complexity
- Scientific career
- Fields: Theoretical Computer Science formal language theory
- Workplaces: University of Milan

Giovanni Pighizzini is an Italian theoretical computer scientist known for his work in formal language theory and particularly in state complexity of two-way finite automata. He earned his PhD in 1993 from the University of Milan, where he is a full professor since 2001. Pighizzini serves as the Steering Committee Chair of the annual Descriptional Complexity of Formal Systems academic conference since 2006.

== Research contributions ==
Pighizzini obtained optimal state complexity tradeoffs between different types of finite automata over a one-letter alphabet, In particular, in his joint paper with Geffert and Mereghetti he presented the first simulation of two-way nondeterministic finite automata by two-way deterministic finite automata using Savitch's theorem, contributing to the 2DFA vs. 2NFA open question. Jointly with Jirásková, he determined state complexity of self-verifying finite automata.

He also contributed to the computational complexity theory by results on sublogarithmic space complexity classes and on the complexity of searching for a lexicographically maximal string.
