= International Conference on Developments in Language Theory =

- Abbreviation: DLT
- Discipline: Formal languages

Publication details
- Publisher: Springer LNCS
- History: 1993–
- Frequency: annual (since 2001)
- Open access: no

DLT, the International Conference on Developments in Language Theory is an academic conference in the field of computer science held annually under the auspices of the European Association for Theoretical Computer Science. Like most theoretical computer science conferences its contributions are strongly peer-reviewed; the articles appear in proceedings published in Springer Lecture Notes in Computer Science. Extended versions of selected papers of each year's conference appear in international journals, such as Theoretical Computer Science and International Journal of Foundations of Computer Science.

== Topics of the conference ==
Typical topics include:

- grammars, acceptors and transducers for words, trees and graphs
- algebraic theories of automata
- algorithmic, combinatorial and algebraic properties of words and languages
- variable length codes
- symbolic dynamics
- cellular automata
- polyominoes and multidimensional patterns
- decidability questions
- image manipulation and compression
- efficient text algorithms
- relationships between formal language theory and cryptography, concurrency, complexity theory and logic
- bio-inspired computing and quantum computing

== History of the Conference ==
The DLT conference series was established by Grzegorz Rozenberg and Arto Salomaa in 1993. Since 2010, the Steering Committee chairman is Juhani Karhumäki.

- 23rd DLT 2019 in Warsaw, Poland
- 22nd DLT 2018 in Tokyo, Japan
- 21st DLT 2017 in Liège, Belgium
- 20th DLT 2016 in Montreal, Canada
- 19th DLT 2015 in Liverpool, England
- 18th DLT 2014 in Ekaterinburg, Russia
- 17th DLT 2013 in Marne-la-Vallée, France
- 16th DLT 2012 in Taipei, Taiwan
- 15th DLT 2011 in Milan, Italy

Special Issue: International Journal of Foundations of Computer Science 23(5), August 2012

- 14th DLT 2010 in London (Ontario), Canada

Special Issue: International Journal of Foundations of Computer Science 22(7), November 2011

- 13th DLT 2009 in Stuttgart, Germany

Special Issue: International Journal of Foundations of Computer Science 22(2), February 2011

- 12th DLT 2008 in Kyoto, Japan

Special Issue: International Journal of Foundations of Computer Science 21(4), August 2010

- 11th DLT 2007 in Turku, Finland

Special Issue: International Journal of Foundations of Computer Science 19(3), June 2008

- 10th DLT 2006 in Santa Barbara, CA, USA

Special Issue: Theoretical Computer Science 376(1-2), May 2007

- 9th DLT 2005 in Palermo, Italy

Special Issue: International Journal of Foundations of Computer Science 17(3), June 2006

- 8th DLT 2004 in Auckland, New Zealand

Special Issue: International Journal of Foundations of Computer Science 16(4), August 2005

- 7th DLT 2003 in Szeged, Hungary

Special Issue: Theoretical Computer Science, 327(3), 2004

- 6th DLT 2002 in Kyoto, Japan
- 5th DLT 2001 in Vienna, Austria
- 4th DLT 1999 in Aachen, Germany
- 3rd DLT 1997 in Thessaloniki, Greece
- 2nd DLT 1995 in Magdeburg, Germany
- 1st DLT 1993 in Turku, Finland

== See also ==
- List of computer science conferences contains other academic conferences in computer science
- Formal languages are the main subject of this conference
