= Michael Detlefsen =

American philosopher (1948–2019)

- Born: October 20, 1948; Scottsbluff, Nebraska, U.S.
- Died: October 21, 2019 (aged 71)
- Occupation: Philosopher

Academic background
- Education: 1971 A. B., Wheaton College, 1976 Ph.D., Johns Hopkins University

Academic work
- Institutions: University of Notre Dame

Michael Detlefsen (20 October 1948 – 21 October 2019) was an American philosopher who was a McMahon-Hank Professor of Philosophy at the University of Notre Dame. His areas of special interest were logic, history of mathematics, philosophy of mathematics and epistemology.

== Biography ==
Michael "Mic" Detlefsen was born on 20 October 1948 in Scottsbluff, Nebraska, U.S.A.

He undertook undergraduate studies at Wheaton College, Illinois, obtaining an A.B. in 1971. He then pursued graduate studies at Johns Hopkins University, Maryland, obtaining his PhD in 1976.

Detlefsen began his academic career as an Assistant, and then Associate Professor, at the University of Minnesota, Duluth in 1975. He remained there until 1983 but would also hold a position as a visiting scholar at the University of Split, Croatia, from 1981 to 1982. He began teaching at Notre Dame as a Visiting Associate Professor in 1983 and became an Associate Professor there in 1984. He was promoted to full professor in 1989 and installed as a McMahon-Hank Professor of Philosophy in 2008

He held visiting professorships at the University of Split (1981–1982), the University of Konstanz (1987–1988, 1994), and at the Paris Diderot University (2007). He held a senior chaire d'excellence with the Agence Nationale de la Recherche (ANR) in France from 2007 through 2011. He was a past president of the Philosophy of Mathematics Association (PMA).

== Scholarly work ==
Detlefsen wrote a number of works on the foundational ideas of the German mathematician David Hilbert, and other major nineteenth and twentieth century foundational thinkers including Bernard Bolzano, L. E. J. Brouwer, Alonzo Church, Richard Dedekind, Gottlob Frege, Kurt Gödel, Moritz Pasch, Henri Poincaré and Bertrand Russell.

He held research fellowships from a number of foundations including the ANR, the Fulbright Foundation, the Alexander von Humboldt Stiftung, the National Endowment for the Humanities and the International Research and Exchange Commission.

He was editor or co-editor in chief of the Notre Dame Journal of Formal Logic from 1985. He was co-editor with Anand Pillay. He was also on the editorial boards of Philosophia Mathematica and the Journal of Universal Computer Science.

Detlefsen was the subject editor for entries in the history and philosophy of logic and mathematics for the Routledge Encyclopedia of Philosophy.

He also organized and directed the annual Midwest PhilMath Workshop (MWPMW) from 2001 and the annual PhilMath Intersem (jointly sponsored by the University of Notre Dame and the Paris Diderot University) from 2010.

== Bibliography ==
=== Books, authored ===
- Hilbert's Program: An Essay on Mathematical Instrumentalism, vol. 182 of the Synthese Library, D. Reidel Publishing Co.,1986, ISBN 978-94-015-7731-1

=== Select articles/book chapters ===
- "Abstraction, Axiomatization and Rigor: Pasch and Hilbert" in Hilary Putnam on Logic and Mathematics, G. Hellman and R. Cook (eds.), 161–178, Springer, 2018
- "On the Motives for Proof Theory", in H. Wansing (ed.), Dag Prawitz on Proofs and Meaning, 137–164, Outstanding Contributions to Logic, Springer, 2015
- "Gentzen's Anti-formalist Ideas", in Gentzen's Centenary: The Quest for Consistency, M. Rathjen and R. Kahle (eds.), 25–44, Springer, 2015
- "Duality, Epistemic Efficiency & Consistency", in G. Link (ed.), Formalism and Beyond, Logos, De Gruyter, 1-24, 2014
- "Completeness and the Ends of Axiomatization", in J. Kennedy (ed.), Interpreting Gödel, 59–77, Cambridge University Press, 2014
- "Freedom and Consistency", in: J. Brendle, R. Downey, R. Goldblatt and B. Kim (eds.), Proceedings of the 12th Asian Logic Conference, 89-111, World Scientific, 2013
- "Purity of Methods", with Andrew Arana, Philosophers' Imprint v. 11, no.2 (2011)

Further publications listed at PhilPapers.
