= JALC =

JALC may refer to:

- Journal of Automata, Languages and Combinatorics
- John A. Logan College
- Jazz at Lincoln Center
