= Mehryar Mohri =

American computer scientist

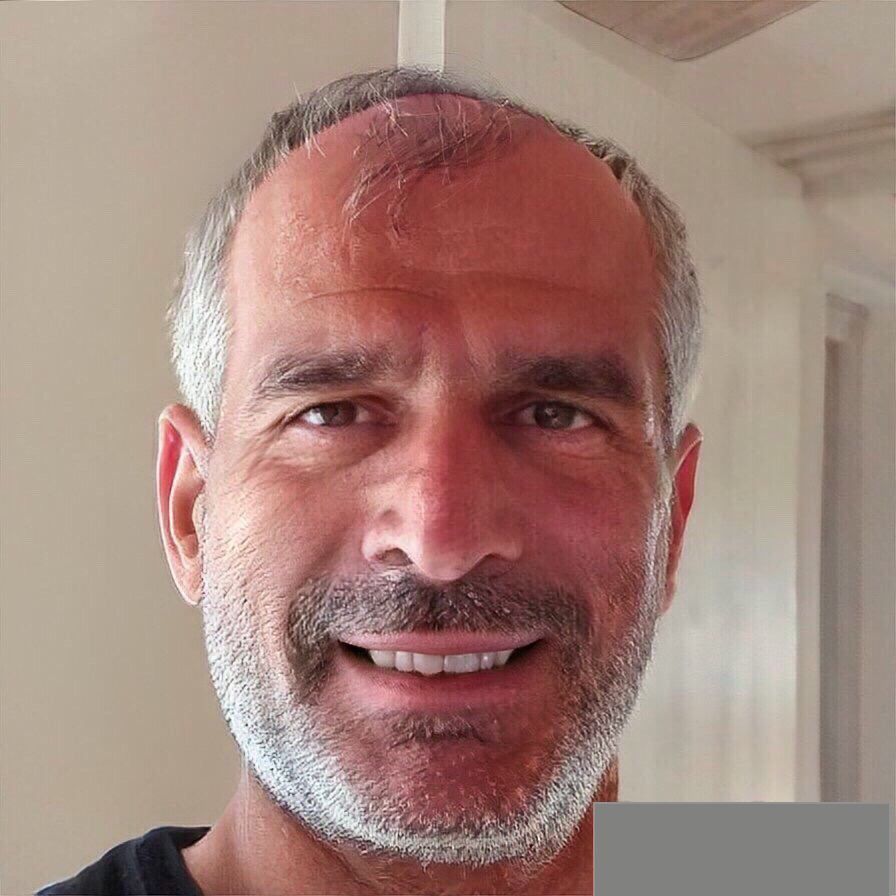
- Mohri in 2020
- Born: October 20, 1964 (age 61)
- Education: École Polytechnique; École Normale Supérieure; University of Paris 7 Denis Diderot
- Known for: Foundations of Machine Learning
- Scientific career
- Workplaces: Google; Courant Institute of Mathematical Sciences; AT&T Bell Labs
- Website: cs.nyu.edu/~mohri/

Mehryar Mohri is a professor and theoretical computer scientist at the Courant Institute of Mathematical Sciences. He is also heading the Machine Learning Theory (ML Theory) team at Google Research.

== Career ==
Prior to joining the Courant Institute, Mohri was a research department head and later technology leader at AT&T Bell Labs, where he was a member of the technical staff for about ten years. Mohri has also taught as an assistant professor at the University of Paris 7 (1992-1993) and Ecole Polytechnique (1992-1994).

== Research ==
Mohri's main area of research is machine learning, in particular learning theory. He is also an expert in automata theory and algorithms. He is the author of several core algorithms that have served as the foundation for the design of many deployed speech recognition and natural language processing systems.

== Publications ==
Mohri is the author of the reference book Foundations of Machine Learning used as a textbook in many graduate-level machine learning courses. Mohri is also a member of the Lothaire group of mathematicians with the pseudonym M. Lothaire and contributed to the book on Applied Combinatorics on Words. He is the author of more than 250 conference and journal publications.

== Organizational affiliations ==
Mohri is currently the president of the Association for Algorithmic Learning Theory (AALT) and the steering committee chair for the ALT conference. He is also editorial board member of Machine Learning and TheoretiCS, action editor of the Journal of Machine Learning Research (JMLR) and a member of the advisory board for the Journal of Automata, Languages and Combinatorics.
