= Brenda Baker =

American computer scientist

Brenda S. Baker
- Education: Radcliffe College; Harvard University
- Known for: Developing Baker's technique
- Scientific career
- Fields: Computer science
- Doctoral advisor: Ronald V. Book

Brenda Sue Baker is an American computer scientist. She is known for Baker's technique for approximation algorithms on planar graphs, for her early work on duplicate code detection, and for her research on two-dimensional bin packing problems.

Baker did her undergraduate studies at Radcliffe College. She earned a Ph.D. from Harvard University in 1973; her dissertation concerned automata theory and formal languages, and was supervised by Ronald V. Book. Early in her career she was an instructor and Vinton-Hayes Research Fellow at Harvard's Division of Engineering and Applied Physics, a visiting lecturer in the Department of Electrical Engineering and Computer Sciences at the University of California, Berkeley, and an assistant professor in the Department of Computer and Communication Sciences at the University of Michigan. Later she worked at Bell Laboratories, becoming a Distinguished Member of Technical Staff there.

Baker married another Bell Labs computer scientist, Eric Grosse, who would later become Google's vice president for Security & Privacy Engineering. Their son, Roger Baker Grosse, is also a computer science researcher.

== Research ==
Her research interests principally include algorithm and software tools. Specifically, she has worked on problems involving string pattern matching, combinatorial algorithms, and approximation algorithms for NP-hard problems.

In the software tools domain, she designed tools to analyze and compare source code and compiled executables. These tools include Dup and Pdiff, which compare regions of source code to determine if there are any repeated segments, as well as Exediff, which enables the creation of small patches for executables without requiring access to the source code they were compiled from.

== Selected publications ==
- Baker, Brenda S.; Book, Ronald V. (1972), "Reversal-bounded multi-pushdown machines", Conference Record of 13th Annual Symposium on Switching and Automata Theory, Institute of Electrical & Electronics Engineers (IEEE), pp. 207–211, doi:10.1109/SWAT.1972.21.
- Baker, Brenda S.; Coffman, E. G. Jr.; Rivest, Ronald L. (1980), "Orthogonal packings in two dimensions", SIAM Journal on Computing, 9 (4): 846–855, doi:10.1137/0209064, MR 0592771
- Baker, Brenda S.; Grosse, Eric; Rafferty, Conor S. (1988), "Nonobtuse triangulation of polygons", Discrete and Computational Geometry, 3 (2): 147–168, doi:10.1007/BF02187904, MR 0920700.
- Baker, Brenda S. (1994), "Approximation algorithms for NP-complete problems on planar graphs", Journal of the ACM, 41 (1): 153–180, doi:10.1145/174644.174650, MR 1369197, S2CID 9706753.
- Baker, Brenda S. (1995), "On finding duplication and near-duplication in large software systems", Proceedings of 2nd Working Conference on Reverse Engineering, Institute of Electrical & Electronics Engineers (IEEE), pp. 86–95, doi:10.1109/wcre.1995.514697, ISBN 978-0-8186-7111-1, S2CID 11446831.
- Baker, Brenda S.; Manber, Udi (1998), "Deducing Similarities in Java Sources from Bytecodes", Proceedings of the USENIX Annual Technical Conference, pp. 179–190.
