= Jetty Kleijn =

Dutch computer scientist

- Born: Henriëtte Cornelia Margaretha Kleijn; September 4, 1955 (age 70)
- Education: PhD of Computer Science, Leiden University, 1983
- Occupation: Professor of Theoretical Computing Science at Leiden University

Jetty Kleijn (short for Henriëtte Cornelia Margaretha Kleijn) is a Dutch computer scientist known for her work in automata theory and concurrent computing, on Petri nets, and on interactions between computer science and biology. A 2020 special issue of Fundamenta Informaticae was dedicated to Kleijn in celebration of her 65th birthday.

== Education and employment ==
Kleijn received a PhD from Leiden University in 1983. Her advisor was Grzegorz Rozenberg. She is currently a professor of Theoretical Computing Science at Leiden University.
