= Ronald V. Book =

American mathematician

- Born: March 5, 1937
- Died: May 28, 1997 (aged 60)
- Education: Harvard University
- Known for: computational complexity theory, term rewriting systems, formal language theory
- Scientific career
- Fields: Computer Science
- Thesis: Grammars with Time Functions
- Doctoral advisor: Sheila Greibach
- Doctoral students: Brenda Baker; Ding-Zhu Du; Kai Salomaa

Ronald Vernon Book (March 5 1937 – May 28, 1997 in Santa Barbara, California) was a theoretical computer scientist. He published more than 150 papers in scientific journals. His papers are of great impact for computational complexity theory and term rewriting.
