= Neil D. Jones =

American computer scientist

Neil Deaton Jones
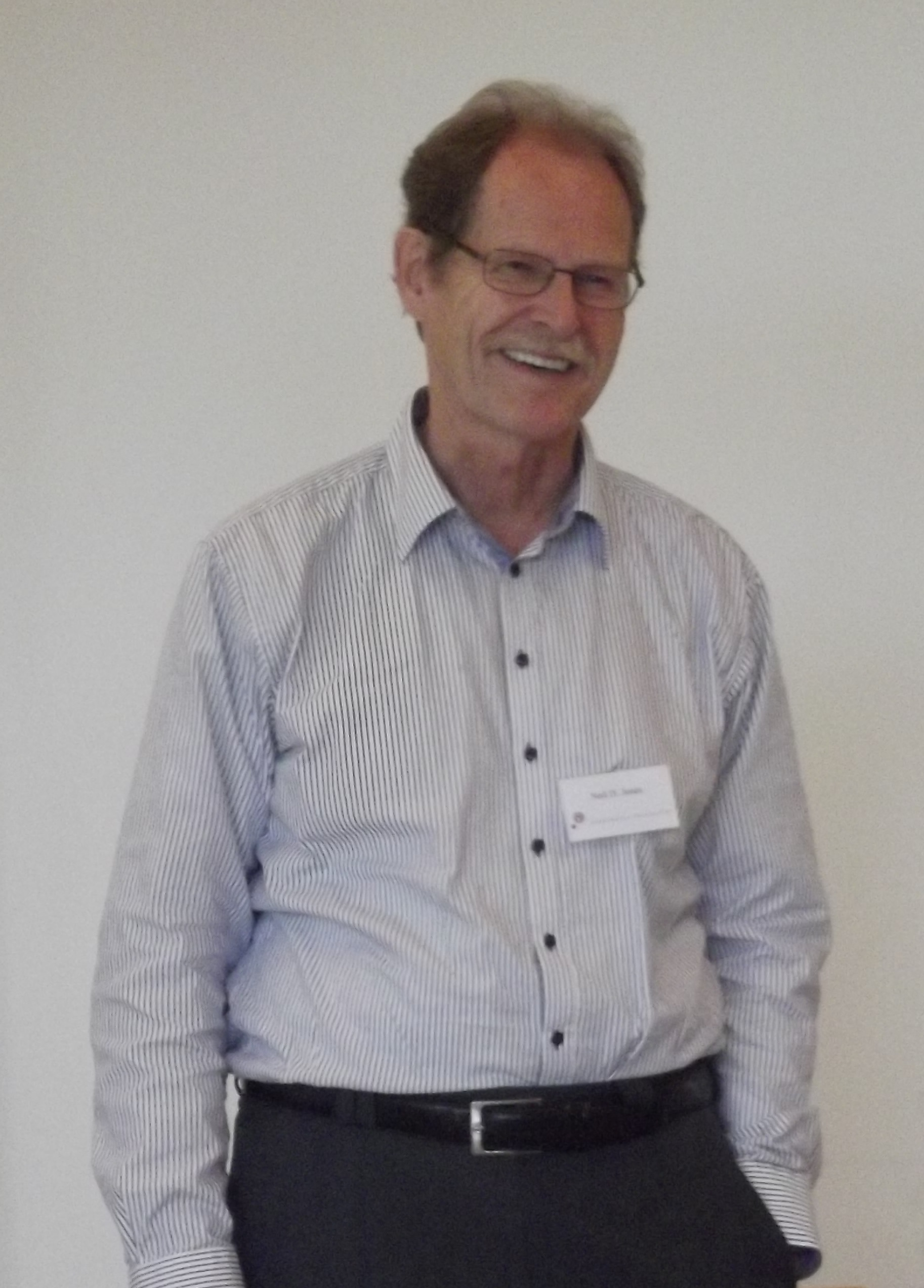
- Born: 22 March 1941; Centralia, Illinois, United States
- Died: 27 March 2023 (aged 82)
- Citizenship: Danish (since 1991)
- Education: University of Western Ontario
- Known for: Partial evaluation, control-flow analysis, size-change termination
- Awards: Order of the Dannebrog (1998); SIGPLAN Programming Languages Achievement Award (2014)
- Scientific career
- Fields: Computer science
- Workplaces: University of Copenhagen; University of Aarhus; University of Kansas; Pennsylvania State University; University of Western Ontario
- Doctoral advisor: Arto Salomaa

Neil Deaton Jones (22 March 1941 Centralia, Illinois, USA - 27 March 2023, Rungsted, Denmark) was an American computer scientist. He was a Professor Emeritus in computer science at University of Copenhagen.

His work spanned both programming languages and the theory of computation. Within programming languages he was particularly known for his work on partial evaluation and for pioneering work within both data-flow analysis, control-flow analysis and termination analysis. Within the theory of computation, he was among the pioneers of the study of Log-space reductions and P-completeness.

Neil D. Jones was a Knight of the Order of the Dannebrog (since 1998) and also a member of the Academia Europaea (since 1999). He was a 1998 Fellow of the Association for Computing Machinery for "outstanding contributions to semantics-directed compilation, especially partial evaluation, and to the theory of computation, formal models and their practical realization".

== Selected publications ==
- Jones, Neil D.; Laaser, William T. (1974). "Complete problems for deterministic polynomial time". Proceedings of the sixth annual ACM symposium on Theory of computing - STOC '74. pp. 40–46. doi:10.1145/800119.803883. S2CID 12251817.
- Jones, Neil D. (1981), "Flow analysis of lambda expressions", Automata, Languages and Programming, Lecture Notes in Computer Science, vol. 115, pp. 114–128, doi:10.1007/3-540-10843-2_10, ISBN 978-3-540-10843-6
- Jones, Neil D.; Gomard, Carsten K.; Sestoft, Peter (1993). Partial Evaluation and Automatic Program Generation. MIT Press. ISBN 9780262100649. Full text available online.
- Jones, Neil D. (1995). "Computability and Complexity from a Programming Perspective (MFPS Draft preview)". Electronic Notes in Theoretical Computer Science. 1: 313–333. doi:10.1016/S1571-0661(04)80019-7.
- Jones, Neil D. (23 January 1997). Computability and Complexity: From a Programming Perspective. MIT Press. ISBN 9780262100649. Online text
- Lee, Chin Soon; Jones, Neil D.; Ben-Amram, Amir M. (2001). "The size-change principle for program termination". ACM SIGPLAN Notices. 36 (3): 81–92. doi:10.1145/373243.360210.
