= Self-verifying finite automaton =

In automata theory, a self-verifying finite automaton (SVFA) is a special kind of a nondeterministic finite automaton (NFA) with a symmetric kind of nondeterminism introduced by Hromkovič and Schnitger. Generally, in self-verifying nondeterminism, each computation path is concluded with any of the three possible answers: yes, no, and I do not know. For each input string, no two paths may give contradictory answers, namely both answers yes and no on the same input are not possible. At least one path must give answer yes or no, and if it is yes then the string is considered accepted. SVFA accept the same class of languages as deterministic finite automata (DFA) and NFA but have different state complexity.

== Formal definition ==
An SVFA is represented formally by a 6-tuple, A=(Q, Σ, Δ, q_{0}, F_{a}, F_{r}) such that (Q, Σ, Δ, q_{0}, F_{a}) is an NFA, and F_{a}, F_{r} are disjoint subsets of Q. For each word w = a_{1}a_{2} … a_{n}, a computation is a sequence of states r_{0},r_{1}, …, r_{n}, in Q with the following conditions:

1. r_{0} = q_{0}
2. r_{i+1} ∈ Δ(r_{i}, a_{i+1}), for i = 0, …, n−1.

If r_{n} ∈ F_{a} then the computation is accepting, and if r_{n} ∈ F_{r} then the computation is rejecting. There is a requirement that for each w there is at least one accepting computation or at least one rejecting computation but not both.

== Results ==
Each DFA is a SVFA, but not vice versa. Jirásková and Pighizzini proved that for every SVFA of n states, there exists an equivalent DFA of $g(n)=\Theta(3^{n/3})$ states. Furthermore, for each positive integer n, there exists an n-state SVFA such that the minimal equivalent DFA has exactly $g(n)$ states.

Other results on the state complexity of SVFA were obtained by Jirásková and her colleagues.
