= Kai Salomaa =

Finnish Canadian theoretical computer scientist

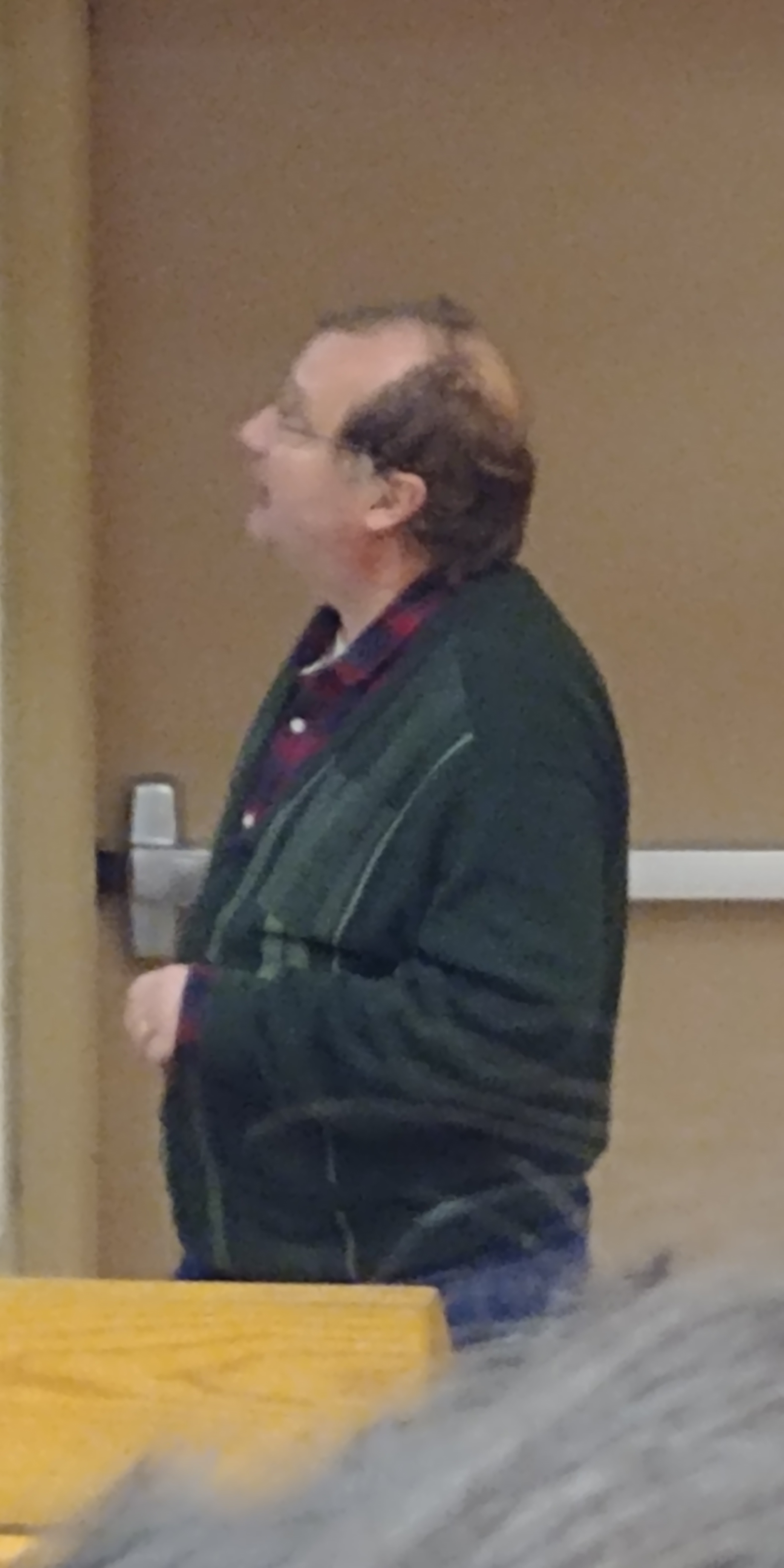
- Born: 9 February 1960 (age 66); Turku, Finland
- Education: University of Turku
- Known for: formal language theory; state complexity
- Scientific career
- Fields: Automata theory
- Workplaces: Queen's University
- Thesis: Alternation and Pushdown Stores in Computations of Tree Automata (1989)
- Doctoral advisor: Magnus Steinby; Ronald V. Book

Kai Tapani Salomaa (born 9 February 1960) is a Finnish Canadian theoretical computer scientist, known for his numerous contributions to the state complexity of finite automata. His highly cited 1994 joint paper with Yu and Zhuang laid the foundations of the area. He has published over 100 papers in scientific journals on various subjects in formal language theory. Salomaa is a full professor at Queen's University (Kingston, Ontario).

== Biography ==
Salomaa did his undergraduate studies at the University of Turku, where he has earned his Ph.D. degree in 1989; his dissertation was jointly supervised by Ronald V. Book and Magnus Steinby. In the 1990s, Salomaa worked at the University of Western Ontario. Since 1999, he holds a professor position at Queen's University. His father, Arto Salomaa, is also a distinguished computer scientist with numerous contributions to the fields of automata theory and formal languages.
