= Arto Salomaa =

Finnish mathematician and computer scientist (1934–2025)

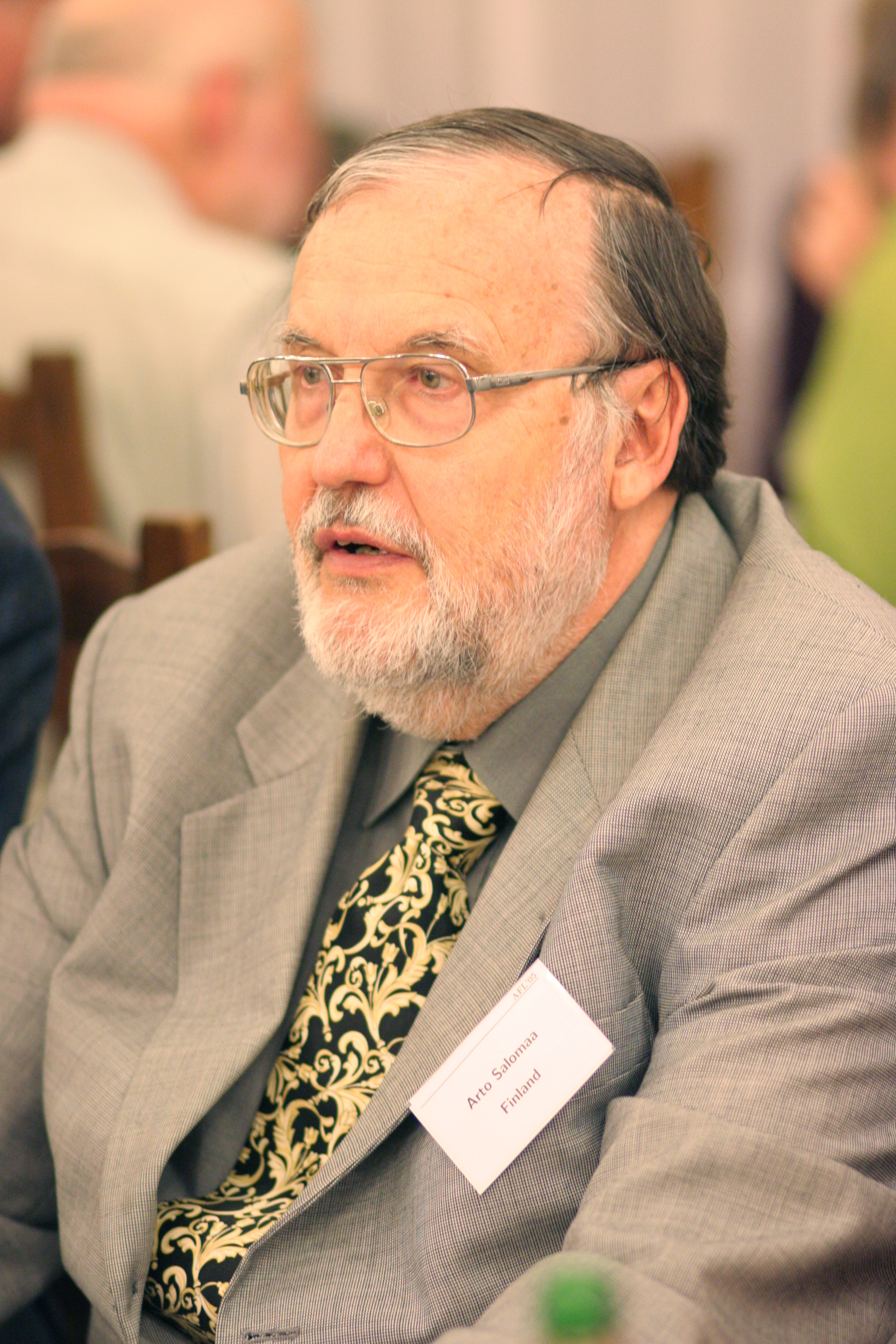
- Salomaa in 2005
- Born: 6 June 1934; Turku, Finland
- Died: 26 January 2025 (aged 90); Kauhajoki, Finland
- Education: Turun Yliopisto
- Scientific career
- Fields: Mathematics; Computer science
- Workplaces: Turun Yliopisto
- Thesis: On the Composition of Functions of Several Variables Ranging Over a Finite Set (1960)
- Doctoral advisor: Kustaa Inkeri
- Doctoral students: Neil D. Jones; Juhani Karhumäki; Jarkko Kari; Lila Kari; Paul Vitanyi

Arto Kustaa Salomaa (6 June 1934 – 26 January 2025) was a Finnish mathematician and computer scientist. His research career, which spanned over 40 years, was focused on formal languages and automata theory.

== Early life and education ==
Salomaa was born in Turku, Finland on 6 June 1934. He earned a Bachelor's degree from the University of Turku in 1954 and a PhD from the same university in 1960. Salomaa's father was a professor of philosophy at the University of Turku. Salomaa was introduced to the theory of automata and formal languages during seminars at Berkeley given by John Myhill in 1957.

== Career ==
In 1965 Salomaa became a professor of mathematics at the University of Turku, a position he retired from in 1999. He also spent two years in the late 1960s at the University of Western Ontario in London, Ontario, Canada, and two years in the 1970s at Aarhus University in Aarhus, Denmark.

Salomaa was president of the European Association for Theoretical Computer Science from 1979 until 1985.

== Publications ==
Salomaa authored or co-authored 46 textbooks, including Theory of Automata (1969), Formal Languages (1973), The Mathematical Theory of L-Systems (1980, with Grzegorz Rozenberg), Jewels of Formal Language Theory (1981) Public-Key Cryptography (1990) and DNA Computing (1998, with Grzegorz Rozenberg and Gheorghe Paun). With Rozenberg, Salomaa edited the Handbook of Formal Languages (1997), a 3-volume, 2000-page reference on formal language theory. These books have often become standard references in their respective areas. For example, Formal Languages was reported in 1991 to be among the 100 most cited texts in mathematics.

Salomaa published over 400 articles in scientific journals during his professional career. He also authored non-scientific articles such as "What computer scientists should know about sauna". From his retirement until 2014, Salomaa published over 100 scientific articles.

== Personal life and death ==
Salomaa married in 1959. He had two children, Kirsti and Kai, the latter of whom is a professor of Computer Science at Queen's University at Kingston and also works in the field of formal languages and automata theory.

Salomaa died on 26 January 2025, at the age of 90. The Research Council of Finland reported his death two days later in a press release, on 28 January.

== Awards and recognition ==
Salomaa was awarded the title of Academician by the Academy of Finland, one of twelve living Finnish individuals awarded the title. He also received the EATCS Award in 2004. Salomaa received seven honorary degrees. On 13 June 2013, Salomaa was awarded a Doctor Honoris Causa from the University of Western Ontario.
