= Lila Kari =

Romanian and Canadian computer scientist

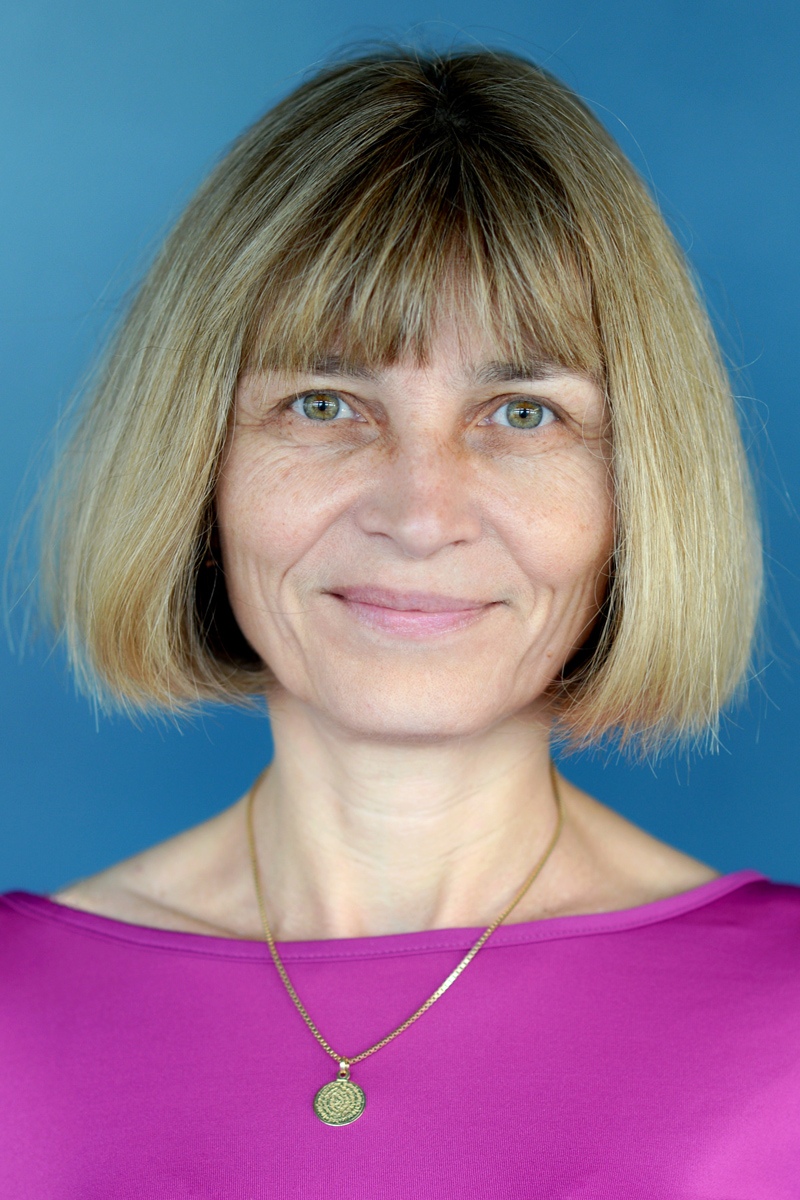
- Citizenship: Romanian; Canadian
- Education: University of Bucharest, University of Turku
- Known for: Biocomputing, DNA computing
- Scientific career
- Fields: Computer science
- Academic advisors: Arto Salomaa
- Website: https://cs.uwaterloo.ca/~lila/

Lila Kari (née Sântean) is a Romanian and Canadian computer scientist, professor in the David R. Cheriton School of Computer Science at the University of Waterloo, Canada.

== Biography ==
Professor Kari earned a master's degree at the University of Bucharest in 1987, studying there with Gheorghe Păun, and then moved to the University of Turku in Finland for her graduate studies, earning a Ph.D. in 1991 under the supervision of Arto Salomaa. She came to the University of Western Ontario as a visiting professor in 1993, and by 1996 had been hired there as a tenure-track faculty member. In 2017 she accepted a position of professor of computer science and University Research Chair at the University of Waterloo.

== Research ==
Kari's thesis research was in formal language theory. In the mid-1990s, inspired by an article by Leonard Adleman in Science, she shifted her interests to DNA computing. In her research, together with Laura Landweber, she has initiated and explored the study of computational power of DNA processing in ciliates, using her expertise to show that the DNA operations performed by genetic recombination in these organisms are Turing complete. In that decade, she also studied theoretical issues relevant to DNA biomollecules such nondeterminism and undecidability in self-assembly. Since the early 2000s, she has focused on the study of genomic signatures and alignment-free methods for biodiversity informatics. Her methods use various theoretical concepts such as Chaos Game Representation of DNA genomic sequences, as well as computational tools including supervised and unsupervised machine learning to identify and classify organisms from different species. A salient application of her work is in the study of genomic signatures of microbial extremophiles where she and her team have uncovered evidence suggesting that, besides taxonomic information, environmental information might also be present in genomic signatures.

== Awards and honors ==
Kari won the Rolf Nevanlinna doctoral thesis award for the best Finnish mathematics doctoral thesis in 1991. From 2002 to 2011, she held a Canada Research Chair in Biocomputing. Kari won the 2015 Rozenberg Tulip Award in DNA Computing, which is awarded by the International Society for Nanoscale Science, Computation and Engineering to recognize outstanding achievements in Biomolecular Computing and Molecular Programming.
