= Viliam Geffert =

Slovak theoretical computer scientist

- Born: 1955 (age 70–71)
- Education: P. J. Šafárik University, Comenius University
- Known for: state complexity, small-space complexity
- Scientific career
- Fields: Automata theory, computational complexity
- Workplaces: P. J. Šafárik University

Viliam Geffert (born 1955) is a Slovak theoretical computer scientist known for his contributions to the computational complexity theory in sublogarithmic space and to the state complexity of two-way finite automata. He has also developed new in-place sorting algorithms. He is a professor and the head of the computer science department at the P. J. Šafárik University in Košice.

== Biography ==
Geffert did his undergraduate studies at the P. J. Šafárik University, graduating in 1979. He earned his PhD degree in 1988 from the Comenius University in Bratislava. Since 2003, he is a full professor of the P. J. Šafárik University.
