= Grzegorz Rozenberg =

Polish and Dutch computer scientist (born 1942)

- Born: March 14, 1942 (age 84); Warsaw
- Education: Polish Academy of Sciences
- Scientific career
- Fields: Computer science
- Workplaces: Leiden University
- Thesis: Quasi-uniform Automata (1968)
- Doctoral advisor: Zdzisław Pawlak
- Doctoral students: Jetty Kleijn

Grzegorz Rozenberg (born 14 March 1942, Warsaw) is a Polish and Dutch computer scientist.

His primary research areas are natural computing, formal language and automata theory, graph transformations, and concurrent systems. He is referred to as the guru of natural computing, as he was promoting the vision of natural computing as a coherent scientific discipline already in the 1970s, gave this discipline its current name, and defined its scope.

His research career spans over forty five years. He is a professor at the Leiden Institute of Advanced Computer Science of Leiden University, The Netherlands and adjoint professor at the department of computer science, University of Colorado at Boulder, USA. Rozenberg is also a performing magician, with the artist name Bolgani and specializing in close-up illusions. He is the father of well-known Dutch artist Dadara.

== Education and career ==
Rozenberg received his Master and Engineer degrees in computer science from the Warsaw University of Technology in Warsaw, Poland. He obtained a Ph.D. in mathematics from the Polish Academy of Sciences also in Warsaw in 1968. Since then he has held full-time positions at the Polish Academy of Sciences, Warsaw, Poland (assistant professor), Utrecht University, The Netherlands (assistant professor), State University of New York at Buffalo, USA (associate professor), and University of Antwerp (UIA), Belgium (professor). Since 1979 he has been a professor of computer science at Leiden University, The Netherlands and adjoint professor at the Department of Computer Science of University of Colorado at Boulder, US.

== Publications and editorial functions ==
Rozenberg has authored over 500 papers, 6 books, and (co-)edited over 100 books and special issues of scientific journals.

He was also a (co-)editor of four handbooks: "Handbook of Formal Languages" (3 volumes, Springer-Verlag), "Handbook of Graph Grammars and Computing by Graph Transformation", "Handbook of Membrane Computing" (Oxford University Press), and the "Handbook of Natural Computing" (4 volumes, Springer-Verlag).

He is on the editorial/advisory board of about 20 journals, and is the editor-in-chief and either the founder or a co-founder of the following journals and book series: International Journal on Natural Computing (Springer-Verlag), Theoretical Computer Science C: Theory of Natural Computing (Elsevier), Monographs in Theoretical Computer Science (Springer-Verlag), Texts in Theoretical Computer Science (Springer-Verlag), and Natural Computing book Series (Springer-Verlag).

== Functions in the academic community ==
G. Rozenberg either founded or co-founded and/or was the chair of the following conferences: International Conference on Developments in Language Theory, International Conference on Graph Transformation, International Conference on Unconventional Computation, International Conference on Theory and Applications of Petri Nets, and the International Meeting on DNA Computing.

Rozenberg was president of the European Association for Theoretical Computer Science from 1985 to 1994 (the longest term in that position) and the editor of the Bulletin of the European Association for Theoretical Computer Science from 1980 until 2003. He also was the president of the International Society for Nanoscale Science, Computation and Engineering, the director of European Molecular Computing Consortium, and the chair of European Educational Forum.

== Awards and recognition ==
G. Rozenberg is a Foreign Member of the Finnish Academy of Sciences and Letters, a member of Academia Europaea, and the holder of Honorary Doctorates of the University of Turku, Finland, Technische Universität Berlin, Germany, the University of Bologna, Italy, the Swedish University Åbo Akademi in Turku, Finland, and the Warsaw University of Technology, Poland. He has received the Distinguished Achievements Award of the European Association for Theoretical Computer Science "in recognition of his outstanding scientific contributions to theoretical computer science". He is an ISI highly cited researcher.

Several books and special issues of scientific journals have been dedicated to G. Rozenberg. Also an annual award granted by International Society for Nanoscale Science, Computation, and Engineering was named after G. Rozenberg. It is called Rozenberg Tulip Award and it is awarded for outstanding achievements in the field of Biomolecular Computing and Molecular Programming.

In 2017, Grzegorz Rozenberg has been appointed Knight in the Order of the Netherlands Lion.
