= Dataframe =

Dataframe may refer to:

- A tabular data structure common to many data processing libraries:
  - pandas (software) § DataFrame
  - The Dataframe API in Apache Spark
  - Data frames in the R programming language
- Frame (networking)
