= Journal of Universal Computer Science =

- Discipline: Computer science
- Language: English
- Edited by: Muhammad Tanvir Afzal, Wolf-Tilo Balke, Christian Gütl, Rocael Hernández Rizzardini, Matthias Jarke, Stefanie Lindstaedt, Peter Serdyukov, Klaus Tochtermann

Publication details
- History: 1994–present
- Publisher: J.UCS Consortium
- Frequency: Monthly
- Open access: Yes
- Impact factor: 1.066 (2017)

Standard abbreviations
- ISO 4: J. Univers. Comput. Sci.
- MathSciNet: J.UCS

Indexing
- ISSN: 0948-695X (print); 0948-6968 (web)
- OCLC no.: 803589940

Links
- Journal homepage

The Journal of Universal Computer Science is a monthly peer-reviewed open-access scientific journal covering all aspects of computer science.

== History ==
The journal was established in 1994 and is published by the J.UCS Consortium, formed by nine research organisations. The editors-in-chief are Muhammad Tanvir Afzal (Capital University of Science & Technology), Wolf-Tilo Balke (Leibniz University Hannover), Christian Gütl (Graz University of Technology), Rocael Hernández Rizzardini (Galileo University), Matthias Jarke (RWTH Aachen University), Stefanie Lindstaedt (Graz University of Technology), Peter Serdyukov (National University), and Klaus Tochtermann (Graz University of Technology).

== Abstracting and indexing ==
The journal is abstracted and indexed in Current Contents/Engineering, Computing & Technology, Science Citation Index Expanded, and Scopus. According to the Journal Citation Reports, the journal has a 2017 impact factor of 1.066.
