= Oscar H. Ibarra =

Filipino-American theoretical computer scientist

Oscar H Ibarra
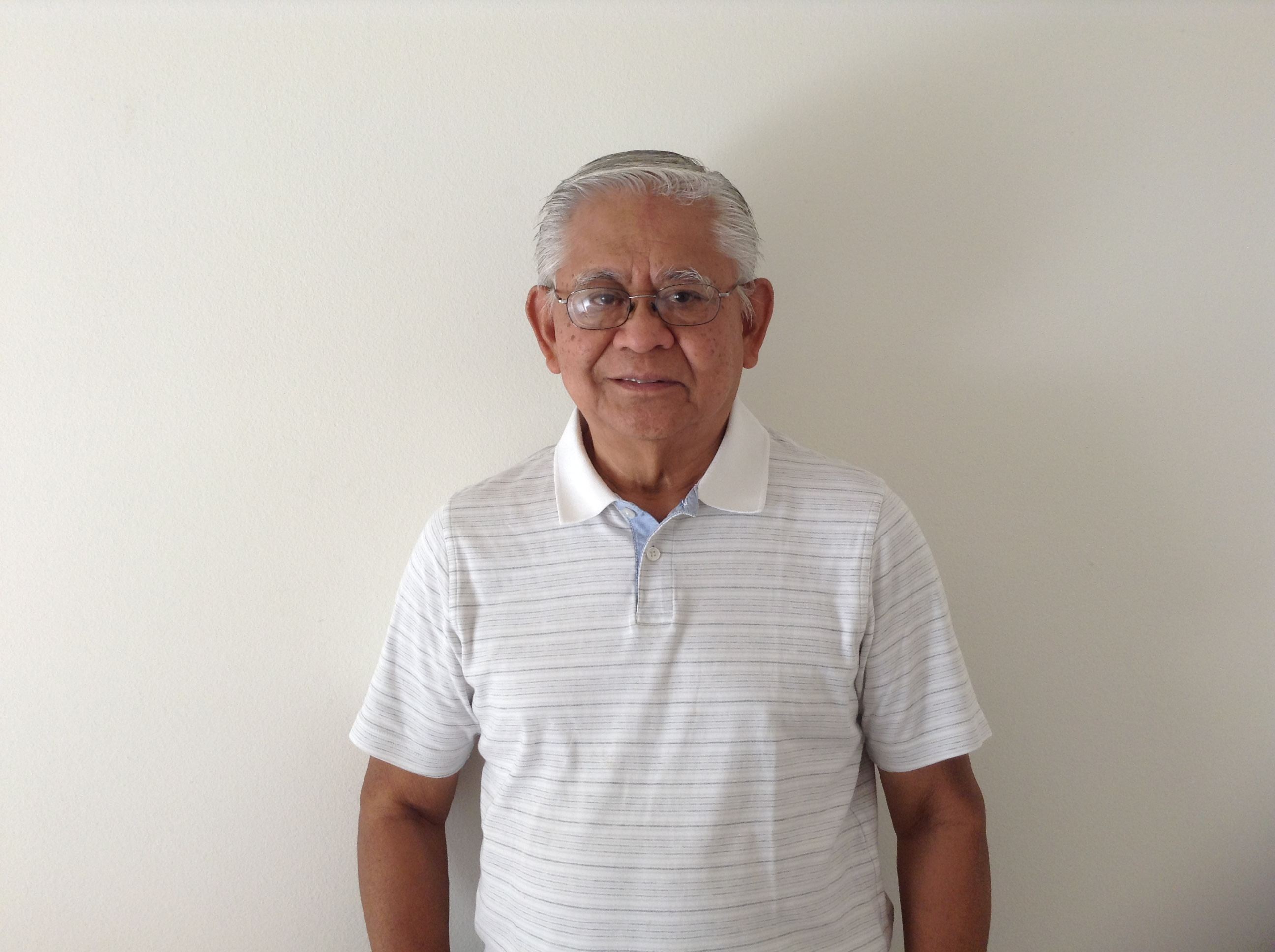
- Prof. Oscar H. Ibarra in 2015.
- Born: September 29, 1941 (age 84)
- Education: University of the Philippines, University of California, Berkeley
- Known for: automata theory, formal languages, computational complexity theory, design and analysis of algorithms
- Awards: Guggenheim Fellow (1984), ACM Fellow (1995), Harry H. Goode Memorial Award (2001), Blaise Pascal Medal (2007)
- Scientific career
- Workplaces: University of California-Santa Barbara, University of Minnesota, University of California, Berkeley
- Doctoral advisor: Michael A. Harrison

Oscar H. Ibarra (born September 29, 1941 in Negros Occidental, Philippines) is a Filipino-American theoretical computer scientist, prominent for work in automata theory, formal languages, design and analysis of algorithms and computational complexity theory. He was a Professor of the Department of Computer Science at the University of California-Santa Barbara until his retirement in 2011. Previously, he was on the faculties of UC Berkeley (1967-1969) and the University of Minnesota (1969-1990). He is currently a Distinguished Professor Emeritus at UCSB.

== Life and career ==
Ibarra received a BS degree in Electrical Engineering from the University of the Philippines and MS and PhD degrees, also in Electrical Engineering, from the University of California, Berkeley in 1965 and 1967, respectively.

Ibarra was awarded a John Simon Guggenheim Memorial Foundation Fellowship in 1984. In 1993, he was elected a Fellow of the American Association for the Advancement of Science. He is a Fellow of the Institute of Electrical and Electronics Engineers and the Association for Computing Machinery. In 2001, he received the IEEE Computer Society's Harry H. Goode Memorial Award. He was elected member of the European Academy of Sciences (EAS) in 2003. He was awarded the Blaise Pascal Medal in Computer Science from EAS in 2007, and in 2008 he was elected a Foreign Member of Academia Europaea in the Informatics Section. In 2008, he was awarded a Distinguished Visiting Fellowship from the UK Royal Academy of Engineering. In July 2015, during the 40th anniversary celebration of the journal, Theoretical Computer Science, Ibarra was named the most prolific author in its 40-year history. He was listed in the Institute for Scientific Information (ISI) database of Highly Cited Researchers in Computer Science in 2003 and in the Computer Science Bibliography DBLP.

== Selected bibliography ==
- Ibarra, O. H., "A Note Concerning Nondeterministic Tape Complexities", J. ACM 19(4): 608-612 (1972).
- Ibarra, O. H., "On Two-way Multihead Automata", J. Comput. Syst. Sci. 7(1): 28-36 (1973).
- Ibarra, O. H. and Chul E. Kim, "Fast Approximation Algorithms for the Knapsack and Sum of Subset Problems", J. ACM 22(4): 463-468 (1975).
- Ibarra, O. H., "Reversal-Bounded Multicounter Machines and Their Decision Problems", J. ACM 25(1): 116-133 (1978).
- Ibarra, O. H., "Some Computational Issues in Membrane Computing", MFCS 2005: 39–5.
