= International Journal of Foundations of Computer Science =

- Discipline: Computer science
- Language: English
- Edited by: Oscar Ibarra

Publication details
- History: 1990–present
- Publisher: World Scientific (Singapore)
- Open access: no

Standard abbreviations
- ISO 4: Int. J. Found. Comput. Sci.
- MathSciNet: Internat. J. Found. Comput. Sci.

Indexing
- ISSN: 0129-0541 (print); 1793-6373 (web)

Links
- Journal homepage

The International Journal of Foundations of Computer Science is a computer science journal published by World Scientific. It was founded in 1990, covering the field of theoretical computer science, from algebraic theory and algorithms, to quantum computing and wireless networks. Since 1997, the editor-in-chief has been Oscar Ibarra of the Department of Computer Science, University of California.

According to the Journal Citation Reports, the journal has a 2020 impact factor of 0.416.

== Abstracting and indexing ==
The Journal is abstracted and indexed by:

- Mathematical Reviews
- Inspec
- DBLP Bibliography Server
- Zentralblatt MATH
- Science Citation Index Expanded
- ISI Alerting Services
- CompuMath Citation Index
- Current Contents/Engineering, Computing & Technology
- MathSciNet
- Computer Abstracts
