= Journal of Automata, Languages and Combinatorics =

- Discipline: Computer science
- Language: English

Publication details
- Former names: Journal of Information Processing and Cybernetics; Elektronische Informationsverarbeitung und Kybernetik
- History: 1965–present
- Publisher: University of Giessen, Institut für Informatik, Giessen (Germany)
- Frequency: Quarterly

Standard abbreviations
- ISO 4: J. Autom. Lang. Comb.

Indexing
- ISSN: 1430-189X
- OCLC no.: 474943262

Links
- Journal homepage

The Journal of Automata, Languages and Combinatorics (JALC) is a peer-reviewed scientific journal of computer science. It was established in 1965 as the Journal of Information Processing and Cybernetics (German: Elektronische Informationsverarbeitung und Kybernetik) and obtained its current title in 1996 with volume numbering reset to 1. The main focus of the journal is on automata theory, formal language theory, and combinatorics.

The editor-in-chief of the journal was, until 2015, Jürgen Dassow of the Otto von Guericke University of Magdeburg. From 2016, the editors in chief are Markus Holzer and Martin Kutrib, and the publication is handled by the Institute of Informatics at the University of Giessen.

Bibliographic databases indexing the journal include the ACM Guide to Computing Literature, the Digital Bibliography & Library Project, the MathSciNet database, and the Zentralblatt MATH.

== Most cited articles ==
According to Google Scholar, the following articles have been cited most often (≥ 100 times):

1. Mehryar Mohri. Semiring frameworks and algorithms for shortest-distance problems. Journal of Automata, Languages and Combinatorics 7(3):321–350 (2002)
2. Rolf Wiehagen. Limes-Erkennung rekursiver Funktionen durch spezielle Strategien. Elektronische Informationsverarbeitung und Kybernetik 12(1/2):93–99 (1976)
3. Gheorghe Păun. Regular extended H systems are computationally universal. Journal of Automata, Languages and Combinatorics 1(1):27–36 (1996)
