= Tree-walking automaton =

A tree-walking automaton (TWA) is a type of finite automaton that deals with tree structures rather than strings. The concept was originally proposed by Aho and Ullman.

The following article deals with tree-walking automata. For a different notion of tree automaton, closely related to regular tree languages, see branching automaton.

== Definition ==
All trees are assumed to be binary, with labels from a fixed alphabet Σ.

Informally, a tree-walking automaton (TWA) A is a finite state device that walks over an input tree in a sequential manner. At each moment A visits a node v in state q. Depending on the state q, the label of the node v, and whether the node is the root, a left child, a right child or a leaf, A changes its state from q to q′ and moves to the parent of v or its left or right child. A TWA accepts a tree if it enters an accepting state, and rejects if its enters a rejecting state or makes an infinite loop. As with string automata, a TWA may be deterministic or nondeterministic.

More formally, a (nondeterministic) tree-walking automaton over an alphabet Σ is a tuple A = (Q, Σ, I, F, R, δ) where Q is a finite set of states, its subsets I, F, and R are the sets of initial, accepting and rejecting states, respectively, and δ ⊆ (Q × { root, left, right, leaf } × Σ × { up, left, right } × Q) is the transition relation.

== Example ==
A simple example of a tree-walking automaton is a TWA that performs depth-first search (DFS) on the input tree. The automaton $A$ has three states, $Q = \{ q_{0}, q_{\mathit{left}}, q_{\mathit{right}} \}$. $A$ begins in the root in state $q_{0}$ and descends to the left subtree. Then it processes the tree recursively. Whenever $A$ enters a node $v$ in state $q_{\mathit{left}}$, it means that the left subtree of $v$ has just been processed, so it proceeds to the right subtree of $v$. If $A$ enters a node $v$ in state $q_{\mathit{right}}$, it means that the whole subtree with root $v$ has been processed and $A$ walks to the parent of $v$ and changes its state to $q_{\mathit{left}}$ or $q_{\mathit{right}}$, depending on whether $v$ is a left or right child.

== Properties ==
Unlike branching automata, tree-walking automata are difficult to analyze: even simple properties are nontrivial to prove. The following list summarizes some known facts related to TWA:

- As shown by Bojańczyk and Colcombet, deterministic TWA are strictly weaker than nondeterministic ones ($\mathit{DTWA} \subsetneq \mathit{TWA}$)
- Deterministic TWA are closed under complementation (but it is not known whether the same holds for nondeterministic ones)
- The set of languages recognized by TWA is strictly contained in regular tree languages ($\mathit{TWA} \subsetneq \mathit{REG}$), i.e. there exist regular languages that are not recognized by any tree-walking automaton, see Bojańczyk and Colcombet.

== See also ==
- Pebble automata, an extension of tree-walking automata
