= Staiger =

Staiger is the German surname for someone living by a steep path. Notable people with this surname include:

- Bettina Staiger (born 1968), German lichenologist
- Carlos Staiger (1907–1997), German-American industrial enterpriser
- Janet Staiger, contemporary American Professor of Communication
- Karl Theodor Staiger (died 1888), German chemical analyst
- Libi Staiger (born 1928), American actress
- Lucca Staiger (born 1988), German college basketball player
- Ludwig Staiger, German mathematician and computer scientist
- Markus Staiger, German founder of the Nuclear Blast record company
- Otto Staiger (1894–1967), Swiss painter
- Reica Staiger (born 1996), Japanese-Swiss ice hockey player
- Roy Staiger (born 1950), American baseball player
