= Cristian Calude =

New Zealand mathematician and computer scientist

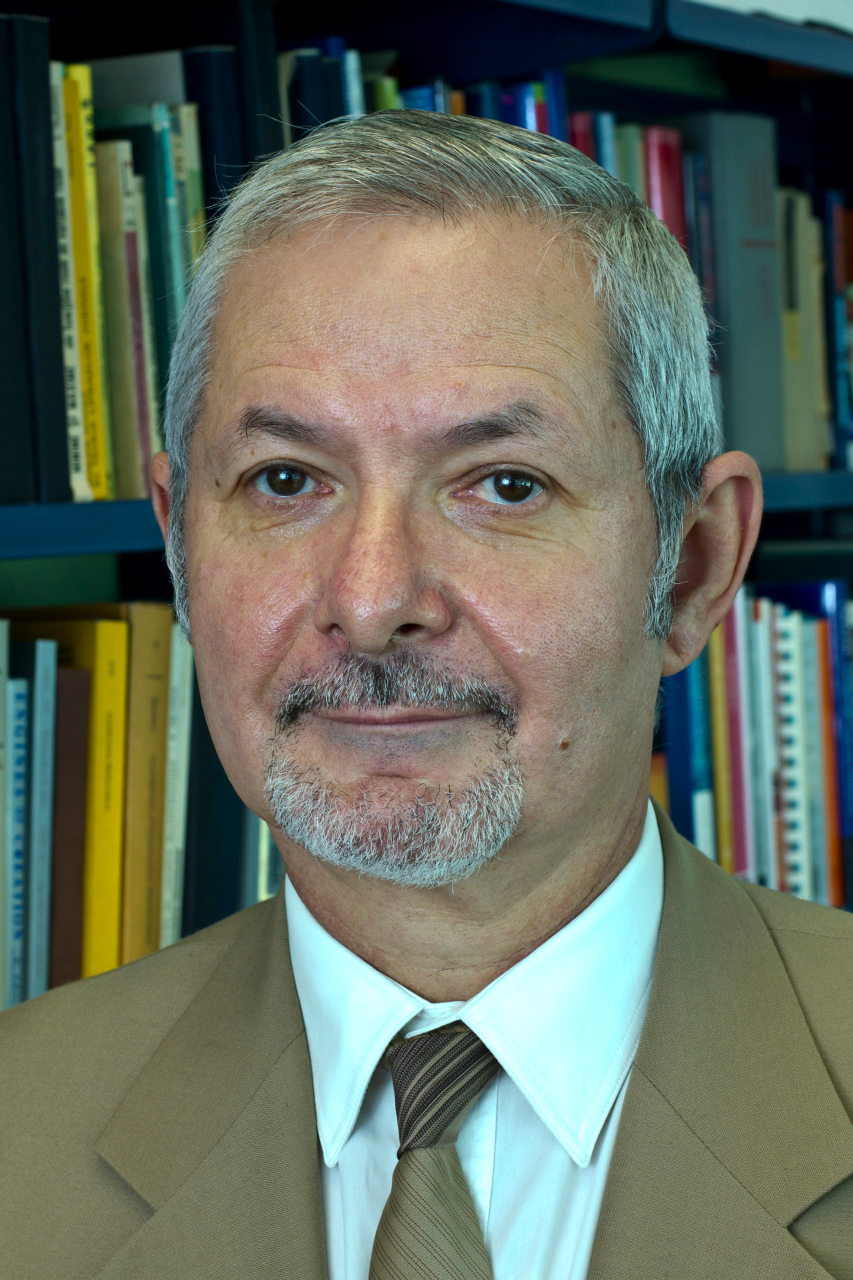
- Calude in 2011
- Born: 21 April 1952 (age 74); Galați, Romania
- Education: University of Bucharest
- Known for: Algorithmic Information Theory and Quantum Theory contributions
- Spouse: Dr. Elena Calude
- Fields: Mathematician, Computer Scientist
- Workplaces: University of Auckland, Academia Europaea
- Thesis: 1977
- Doctoral advisor: Solomon Marcus
- Website: calude.net/cristianscalude/about/

Cristian Sorin Calude (born 21 April 1952) is a New Zealand mathematician and computer scientist.

== Biography ==
After graduating from the Vasile Alecsandri National College in Galați, he studied at the University of Bucharest, where he was student of Grigore C. Moisil and Solomon Marcus. Calude received his Ph.D. in Mathematics from the University of Bucharest under the direction of Solomon Marcus in 1977.

He is currently chair professor at the University of Auckland, New Zealand and also the founding director of the Centre for Discrete Mathematics and Theoretical Computer Science. Visiting professor in many universities in Europe, North and South America, Australasia, South Africa, including Monbusho Visiting professor, JAIST, 1999 and visiting professor ENS, Paris, 2009, École Polytechnique, Paris, 2011; visiting fellow, Isaac Newton Institute for Mathematical Sciences, 2012; guest professor, Sun Yat-sen University, Guangzhou, China, 2017–2020; visiting fellow ETH Zurich, 2019. Former professor at the University of Bucharest. Calude is author or co-author of more than 270 research articles and 8 books, and is cited by more than 550 authors. He is known for research in algorithmic information theory, quantum computing, discrete mathematics and the history and philosophy of computation.

In 2017, together with Sanjay Jain, Bakhadyr Khoussainov, Wei Li, and Frank Stephan, he announced an algorithm for deciding parity games in quasipolynomial time. Their result was presented by Bakhadyr Khoussainov at the Symposium on Theory of Computing 2017 and won a Best Paper Award.

Calude was awarded the National Order of Faithful Service in the degree of Knight by the President of Romania, Klaus Iohannis, in June 2019.

In 2021, together with Sanjay Jain, Bakhadyr Khoussainov, Wei Li, and Frank Stephan, he won the EATCS Nerode Prize for their quasipolynomial time algorithm for deciding parity games.

Calude has Erdős Number 2 via to Solomon Marcus.

== Distinctions and prizes ==
- "Computing Reviews Award", Association for Computing Machinery, New York City, 1986.
- "Gheorghe Lazăr" Mathematics Prize, Romanian Academy, Romania, 1988.
- Excellence in Research Award, University of Bucharest, Romania, 2007.
- Dean's Award for Excellence in Teaching, University of Auckland, 2007.
- Hood Fellow, 2008–2009.
- Member of the Academia Europaea, 2008.
- Romanian National Order of Faithful Service in the degree of Knight, June 2019.
- "EATCS-IPEC Nerode Prize", 2021.
- "Doctor Honoris Causa, Apolonia University, Iasi, Romania", 2023,
- "Full Member SIGMA XI", 2024.

== Selected bibliography ==
=== Articles ===
- Calude, Cristian S.; Svozil, Karl (2024). "Binary Quantum Random Number Generator Based on Value Indefinite Observables". Scientific Reports. 14 (1) 12845. arXiv:2312.10973. Bibcode:2024NatSR..1412845C. doi:10.1038/s41598-024-62566-2. ISSN 2045-2322. PMC 11150379. PMID 38834594.
- Agüero Trejo, José Manuel; Calude, Cristian S. (2023). "Photonic ternary quantum random number generators". Proc. R. Soc. A. 479 (2273) 20220543. Bibcode:2023RSPSA.47920543T. doi:10.1098/rspa.2022.0543.
- Calude, Cristian S.; Heidar, Shahrokh; Sifakis, Joseph (2023). "What perceptron neural networks are (not) good for?". Information Sciences. 621: IS–844–IS-188. doi:10.1016/j.ins.2022.11.083.
- Calude, Cristian S.; Jain, Sanjay; Khoussainov, Bakhadyr; Li, Wei; Stephan, Frank (2022). "Deciding Parity Games in Quasi-polynomial Time". SIAM Journal on Computing. 51 (2): STOC17–152–STOC17-188. doi:10.1137/17M1145288. hdl:2292/31757. ISSN 0097-5397.
- Abbott, Alastair A.; Calude, Cristian S.; Dinneen, Michael J.; Hua, Richard (2019). "A hybrid quantum-classical paradigm to mitigate embedding costs in quantum annealing". International Journal of Quantum Information. 17 (5): 1950042–1950453. arXiv:1803.04340. Bibcode:2019IJQI...1750042A. doi:10.1142/S0219749919500424. ISSN 0219-7499.
- Abbott, Alastair A; Calude, Cristian S; Dinneen, Michael J; Huang, Nan (1 April 2019). "Experimentally probing the algorithmic randomness and incomputability of quantum randomness". Physica Scripta. 94 (4): 045103. arXiv:1806.08762. Bibcode:2019PhyS...94d5103A. doi:10.1088/1402-4896/aaf36a. ISSN 0031-8949.
- Calude, Cristian S.; Dumitrescu, Monica (7 June 2018). "A probabilistic anytime algorithm for the halting problem". Computability. 7 (2–3): 259–271. doi:10.3233/COM-170073.
- Calude, Cristian S.; Staiger, Ludwig (2018). "Liouville, Computable, Borel Normal and Martin-Löf Random Numbers". Theory of Computing Systems. 62 (7): 1573–1585. doi:10.1007/s00224-017-9767-8. ISSN 1432-4350.
- Calude, Cristian S.; Staiger, Ludwig; Stephan, Frank (2016). "Finite state incompressible infinite sequences". Information and Computation. 247: 23–36. doi:10.1016/j.ic.2015.11.003. hdl:2292/21343.
- Calude, Cristian S.; Longo, Giuseppe (2017). "The Deluge of Spurious Correlations in Big Data" (PDF). Foundations of Science. 22 (3): 595–612. doi:10.1007/s10699-016-9489-4. ISSN 1233-1821.
- Abbott, Alastair A.; Calude, Cristian S.; Svozil, Karl (1 October 2015). "A variant of the Kochen-Specker theorem localising value indefiniteness". Journal of Mathematical Physics. 56 (10): 102201. arXiv:1503.01985. Bibcode:2015JMP....56j2201A. doi:10.1063/1.4931658. ISSN 0022-2488.
- Calude, Cristian S.; Calude, Elena; Dinneen, Michael J. (9 March 2015). "Guest Column: Adiabatic Quantum Computing Challenges". ACM SIGACT News. 46 (1): 40–61. doi:10.1145/2744447.2744459. ISSN 0163-5700.
- Abbott, Alastair A.; Calude, Cristian S.; Svozil, Karl (10 March 2014). "Value-indefinite observables are almost everywhere". Physical Review A. 89 (3): 032109-032116. arXiv:1309.7188. Bibcode:2014PhRvA..89c2109A. doi:10.1103/PhysRevA.89.032109. ISSN 1050-2947.
- Calude, Cristian S.; Dinneen, Michael J.; Dumitrescu, Monica; Svozil, Karl (6 August 2010). "Experimental evidence of quantum randomness incomputability". Physical Review A. 82 (2) 022102. arXiv:1004.1521. Bibcode:2010PhRvA..82b2102C. doi:10.1103/PhysRevA.82.022102. ISSN 1050-2947.
- Calude, Cristian S.; Stay, Michael A. (2008). "Most programs stop quickly or never halt". Advances in Applied Mathematics. 40 (3): 295–308. arXiv:cs/0610153. doi:10.1016/j.aam.2007.01.001.
- Calude, C. S.; Chaitin, G. J. (1999). "Randomness everywhere". Nature. 400 (6742): 319–320. doi:10.1038/22435. ISSN 0028-0836.

=== Books ===
- C. S. Calude. To Halt or Not to Halt? That Is the Question, World Scientific, Singapore, 2024. doi:10.1142/12159 Russian: , Romanian: .
- Alastair A. Abbott (Special Issue Guest Editor), Cezar Câmpeanu (Special Issue Guest Editor), Ludwig Staiger (Special Issue Guest Editor), Marius Zimand (Special Issue Guest Editor), Arto Salomaa (Special Invited Guest). Frontiers of Computability, Randomness, and Complexity (dedicated to the 70th birthday of Professor Cristian Calude), Theoretical Computer Science, Volume 952, 31 March 2023, 113819
- A. Bellow, C. S. Calude, T. Zamfirescu, (eds.) Mathematics Almost Everywhere: In Memory of Solomon Marcus, World Scientific, Singapore, 2018. doi:10.1142/10912.
- M. Burgin, C. S. Calude, (eds.) Information and Complexity World Scientific, Singapore, 2017. doi:10.1142/10017.
- C. S. Calude (ed.) The Human Face of Computing, Imperial College Press, London, 2015. 21st Annual Best of Computing, The Notable Books and Articles List for 2016, ACM Computing Reviews, July 2017. doi:10.1142/p992.
- C. S. Calude (ed.) Randomness & Complexity, From Leibniz to Chaitin, World Scientific, Singapore, 2007. doi:10.1142/6577,
- C. S. Calude. Information and Randomness: An Algorithmic Perspective, 2nd Edition, Revised and Extended, Springer-Verlag, Berlin, 2002. doi:10.1007/978-3-662-04978-5.
- C. S. Calude, G. Păun. Computing with Cells and Atoms, Taylor & Francis, London, 2001. ISBN 978-0-7484-0899-3.
- C. Calude. Theories of Computational Complexity, North-Holland, Amsterdam, 1988. ISBN 978-0-444-70356-9.
