= Myhill =

The surname Myhill may refer to:

- Boaz Myhill (born 1982), American-born Welsh footballer
- John Myhill (1923—1987), British mathematician
- Kirby Myhill (born 1992), Welsh rugby union player

In mathematics and theoretical computer science, the name appears also in:

- Myhill congruence
- Myhill's constructive set theory
- Myhill graph
- Myhill isomorphism theorem
- Myhill–Nerode theorem
- Myhill's property
- Rice-Myhill-Shapiro theorem
