= Pebble automaton =

In computer science, a pebble automaton is any variant of an automaton which augments the original model with a finite number of "pebbles" that may be used to mark tape positions.

== History ==
Pebble automata were introduced in 1986, when it was shown that in some cases, a deterministic transducer augmented with a pebble could achieve logarithmic space savings over even a nondeterministic log-space transducer (ie, compute in $\log \log n$ tape cells functions for which the nondeterministic machine required $\log n$ tape cells), with the implication that a pebble adds power to Turing machines whose functions require space between $\log\log n$ and $\log n.$ Constructions were also shown to convert a hierarchy of increasingly powerful stack machine models into equivalent deterministic finite automata with up to 3 pebbles, showing additional pebbles further increased power.

== Tree-walking automata with nested pebbles ==
A tree-walking automaton with nested pebbles is a tree-walking automaton with an additional finite set of fixed size containing pebbles, identified with $\{ 1, 2, \dots, n \}$. Besides ordinary actions, an automaton can put a pebble at a currently visited node, lift a pebble from the currently visited node and perform a test "is the i-th pebble present at the current node?". There is an important stack restriction on the order in which pebbles can be put or lifted - the i+1-th pebble can be put only if the pebbles from 1st to i-th are already on the tree, and the i+1-th pebble can be lifted only if pebbles from i+2-th to n-th are not on the tree. Without this restriction, the automaton has undecidable emptiness and expressive power beyond regular tree languages.

The class of languages recognized by deterministic (resp. nondeterministic) tree-walking automata with n pebbles is denoted $DPA_{n}$ (resp. $PA_{n}$). We also define $DPA = \bigcup_{n} DPA_{n}$ and likewise $PA = \bigcup_{n} PA_{n}$.

== Properties ==
- there exists a language recognized by a tree-walking automaton with 1 pebble, but not by any ordinary tree walking automaton; this implies that either $TWA \subsetneq DPA$ or these classes are incomparable, which is an open problem
- $PA \subsetneq REG$, i.e. tree-walking automata augmented with pebbles are strictly weaker than branching automata
- it is not known whether $DPA = PA$, i.e. whether tree-walking pebble automata can be determinized
- it is not known whether tree-walking pebble automata are closed under complementation
- the pebble hierarchy is strict for tree-walking automata, for every n $PA_{n} \subsetneq PA_{n+1}$ and $DPA_{n} \subsetneq DPA_{n+1}$

== Automata and logic ==
Tree-walking pebble automata admit an interesting logical characterization. Let $FO+TC$ denote the set of tree properties describable in transitive closure first-order logic, and $FO+\text{pos}\,TC$ the same for positive transitive closure logic, i.e. a logic where the transitive closure operator is not used under the scope of negation. Then it can be proved that $PA \subseteq FO+TC$ and, in fact, $PA = FO+\text{pos}\,TC$ - the languages recognized by tree-walking pebble automata are exactly those expressible in positive transitive closure logic.

== See also ==
- Tree walking automata
- Branching automata
- Transitive closure logic
- Pebble game
