= Set constraint =

Set constraints obtained from abstract interpretation of the Collatz algorithm

In mathematics and theoretical computer science, a set constraint is an equation or an inequation between sets of terms. Similar to systems of (in)equations between numbers, methods are studied for solving systems of set constraints. Different approaches admit different operators (like "∪", "∩", "\", and function application) (Note: If f is an n-ary function symbol admitted in a term, then "f(E_{1},...,E_{n})" is a set expression denoting the set { f(t_{1},...,t_{n}) : t_{1}∈E_{1} and ... and t_{n}∈E_{n} }, where E_{1},...,E_{n} are set expressions in turn.) on sets and different (in)equation relations (like "=", "⊆", and "⊈") between set expressions.

Systems of set constraints are useful to describe (in particular infinite) sets of ground terms. (Note: This is similar to describing e.g. a rational number as a solution to an equation a⋅x + b = 0, with integer coefficients a, b.) They arise in program analysis, abstract interpretation, and type inference.

== Relation to regular tree grammars ==
Each regular tree grammar can be systematically transformed into a system of set inclusions such that its minimal solution corresponds to the tree language of the grammar.

For example, the grammar (terminal and nonterminal symbols indicated by lower and upper case initials, respectively) with the rules

Bool_{G}	→ false
Bool_{G}	→ true
BList_{G}	→ nil
BList_{G}	→ cons(Bool_{G},BList_{G})
BList1_{G}	→ cons(true,BList_{G})
BList1_{G}	→ cons(false,BList1_{G})

is transformed to the set inclusion system (constants and variables indicated by lower and upper case initials, respectively):

Bool_{S}	⊇ false
Bool_{S}	⊇ true
BList_{S}	⊇ nil
BList_{S}	⊇ cons(Bool_{S},BList_{S})
BList1_{S}	⊇ cons(true,BList_{S})
BList1_{S}	⊇ cons(false,BList1_{S})

This system has a minimal solution, viz. ("L(N)" denoting the tree language corresponding to the nonterminal N in the above tree grammar):

Bool_{S}	= L(Bool_{G})	= { false, true }
BList_{S}	= L(BList_{G})	= { nil, cons(false,nil), cons(true,nil), cons(false,cons(false,nil)), ... }
BList1_{S}	= L(BList1_{G})	= { nil, cons(true,nil), cons(true,cons(false,nil)),... }

The maximal solution of the system is trivial; it assigns the set of all terms to every variable.

== Literature ==
- Aiken, A. (1995). Set Constraints: Results, Applications and Future Directions (Technical report). Univ. Berkeley.
- Aiken, A., Kozen, D., Vardi, M., Wimmers, E.L. (May 1993). The Complexity of Set Constraints (Technical report). Computer Science Department, Cornell University. 93–1352.
- Aiken, A., Kozen, D., Vardi, M., Wimmers, E.L. (1994). "The Complexity of Set Constraints". Computer Science Logic'93. LNCS. Vol. 832. Springer. pp. 1–17.
- Aiken, A., Wimmers, E.L. (1992). "Solving Systems of Set Constraints (Extended Abstract)". Seventh Annual IEEE Symposium on Logic in Computer Science. pp. 329–340.
- Bachmair, Leo, Ganzinger, Harald, Waldmann, Uwe (1992). Set Constraints are the Monadic Class (Technical report). Max-Planck-Institut für Informatik. p. 13. MPI-I-92-240.
- Bachmair, Leo, Ganzinger, Harald, Waldmann, Uwe (1993). "Set Constraints are the Monadic Class". Eight Annual IEEE Symposium on Logic in Computer Science. pp. 75–83.
- Charatonik, W. (Sep 1994). "Set Constraints in Some Equational Theories". Proc. 1st Int. Conf. on Constraints in Computational Logics (CCL). LNCS. Vol. 845. Springer. pp. 304–319.
- Charatonik, Witold; Podelski, Andreas (2002). "Set Constraints with Intersection". Information and Computation. 179 (2): 213–229. doi:10.1006/inco.2001.2952.
- Charatonik, W., Podelski, A. (1998). Tobias Nipkow (ed.). Co-definite Set Constraints. LNCS 1379. Springer-Verlag. pp. 211–225.
- Charatonik, W., Talbot, J.-M. (2002). Tison, S. (ed.). Atomic Set Constraints with Projection. LNCS 2378. Springer. pp. 311–325.
- Gilleron, R., Tison, S., Tommasi, M. (1993). "Solving Systems of Set Constraints using Tree Automata". 10th Annual Symposium on Theoretical Aspects of Computer Science. LNCS. Vol. 665. Springer. pp. 505–514.
- Heintze, N., Jaffar, J. (1990). "A Decision Procedure for a Class of Set Constraints (Extended Abstract)". Fifth Annual IEEE Symposium on Logic in Computer Science. pp. 42–51.
- Heintze, N., Jaffar, J. (Feb 1991). A Decision Procedure for a Class of Set Constraints (Technical report). School of Computer Science, Carnegie Mellon University.
- Kozen, D. (1993). "Logical Aspects of Set Constraints" (PDF). Computer Science Logic'93. LNCS. Vol. 832. pp. 175–188.
- Kozen, D. (1994). "Set Constraints and Logic Programming". CCL. LNCS. Vol. 845.
- Dexter Kozen (1998). "Set Constraints and Logic Programming". Information and Computation. 142: 2–25. doi:10.1006/inco.1997.2694.
- Uribe, T.E. (1992). "Sorted Unification Using Set Constraints". Proc. CADE–11. LNCS. Vol. 607. pp. 163–177.

=== Literature on negative constraints ===
- Aiken, A., Kozen, D., Wimmers, E.L. (Jun 1993). Decidability of Systems of Set Constraints with Negative Constraints (Technical report). Computer Science Department, Cornell University. 93–1362.
- Charatonik, W., Pacholski, L. (Jul 1994). "Negative Set Constraints with Equality". Ninth Annual IEEE Symposium on Logic in Computer Science. pp. 128–136.
- R. Gilleron; S. Tison; M. Tommasi (1993). "Solving Systems of Set Constraints with Negated Subset Relationships". Proceedings of the 34th Symp. on Foundations of Computer Science. pp. 372–380.
- Gilleron, R., Tison, S., Tommasi, M. (1993). Solving Systems of Set Constraints with Negated Subset Relationships (Technical report). Laboratoire d'Informatique Fondamentale de Lille. IT 247.
- Stefansson, K. (Aug 1993). Systems of Set Constraints with Negative Constraints are NEXPTIME-Complete (Technical report). Computer Science Department, Cornell University. 93–1380.
- Stefansson, K. (1994). "Systems of Set Constraints with Negative Constraints are NEXPTIME-Complete". Ninth Annual IEEE Symposium on Logic in Computer Science. pp. 137–141.
