= Bakhadyr Khoussainov =

Computer scientist and mathematician in New Zealand

Bakhadyr M. Khoussainov (Russian: Бахадыр Хусаинов) is a computer scientist and mathematician, who was born and educated in the Soviet Union, works in the fields of mathematical logic, computability theory, computable model theory and theoretical computer science. With Anil Nerode, he is the co-founder of the theory of automatic structures, which is an extension of the theory of automatic groups.

== Biography ==
Khoussainov received his undergraduate degree from the Mathematics Department of Novosibirsk State University in 1984. In 1988, he received his Candidate of Sciences degree (equivalent to a PhD) in Algebra and Logic from Novosibirsk State University with the supervision of an Academician of the Russian Academy of Sciences Sergei Goncharov.

In 1991 Khoussainov joined Cornell University and held an H.C. Wang Assistant Professorship at the Mathematics Department from 1995 to 1997.

In 1996 Khoussainov joined the University of Auckland, and remained until 2021 when he moved to the UESTC.

Khoussainov has held visiting positions at Cornell University, the University of Chicago, the National University of Singapore, Kyoto University, JAIST and the University of Wisconsin-Madison.

== Awards and recognition ==
Khoussainov is a co-winner (together with Cristian Calude, Sanjay Jain, Wei Li and Frank Stephan) of the STOC 2017 best paper award for a quasi-polynomial time algorithm deciding parity games. For this work, Khoussainov and this paper's co-authors were awarded the 2021 EATCS-IPEC Nerode Prize. In 2023 while working in the UESTC, China, Khoussainov has also been elected as a foreign member of The Academia Europaea, the European Academy of Sciences, Humanities, Letters, and Law.

A fellow of the Royal Society of New Zealand, Khoussainov has also received:

- the 2020 Humboldt prize;
- the 2019 Aitken Lecturership;
- multiple JSPS Invitation Fellowships (2001, 2012, and 2014);
- multiple Marsden Fund grants (2001, 2004, 2008 and 2012);
- the 2002 Research Excellence Award of the New Zealand Mathematical Society.
