= Ludwig Staiger =

German mathematician and computer scientist

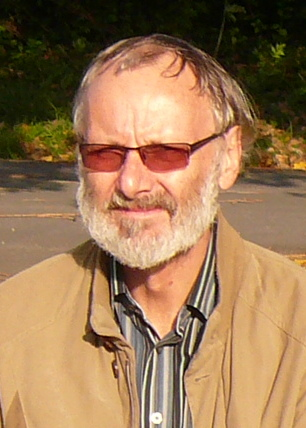
Ludwig Staiger in 2010

Ludwig Staiger is a German mathematician and computer scientist at the Martin Luther University of Halle-Wittenberg.

He received his Ph.D. in mathematics from the University of Jena in 1976; Staiger wrote his doctoral thesis, Zur Topologie der regulären Mengen, under the direction of Gerd Wechsung and Rolf Lindner.

Previously he held positions at the Academy of Sciences in Berlin (East), the Central Institute of Cybernetics and Information Processes, the Karl Weierstrass Institute for Mathematics and the Technical University Otto-von-Guericke Magdeburg. He was a visiting professor at RWTH Aachen University, the universities Dortmund, Siegen, and Cottbus in Germany and the Technical University Vienna, Austria. He is a member of the Managing Committee of the Georg Cantor Association and an external researcher of the Center for Discrete Mathematics and Theoretical Computer Science at the University of Auckland, New Zealand.

He co-invented with Klaus Wagner the Staiger–Wagner automaton. Staiger is an expert in ω-languages, an area in which he wrote more than 19 papers including the paper on this topic in the monograph. He found surprising applications of ω-languages in the study of Liouville numbers.

Staiger is an active researcher in combinatorics on words, automata theory, effective dimension theory, and algorithmic information theory. He has Erdős Number 2 via to Solomon Marcus.

== Bibliography ==
- Alastair A. Abbott (Special Issue Guest Editor), Cezar Câmpeanu (Special Issue Guest Editor), Ludwig Staiger (Special Issue Guest Editor), Marius Zimand (Special Issue Guest Editor), Arto Salomaa (Special Invited Guest). Frontiers of Computability, Randomness, and Complexity (dedicated to the 70th birthday of Professor Cristian Calude), Theoretical Computer Science, Volume 952, 31 March 2023, 113819.
- L. Staiger. Quasiperiods of infinite words. In Alexandra Bellow, Cristian S. Calude, Tudor Zamfirescu, editors, Mathematics Almost Everywhere: In Memory of Solomon Marcus, pages 17–36, World Scientific, Singapore, 2018.
- C. S. Calude, L. Staiger. Liouville numbers, Borel normality and algorithmic randomness, Theory of Computing Systems, First online 27 April 2017, doi:10.1007/s00224-017-9767-8.
- Staiger, L. "Exact Constructive and Computable Dimensions", Theory of Computing Systems 61 (2017) 4, 1288-1314.
- C. S. Calude, L. Staiger, F. Stephan. Finite state incompressible infinite sequences, Information and Computation 247 (2016), 23-36.
- Staiger, L. "On Oscillation-Free Chaitin h-Random Sequences". In M. Dinneen, B. Khoussainov and A. Nies, editors, Computation, Physics and Beyond, pages 194-202. Springer-Verlag, 2012.
- Staiger, L. The Kolmogorov complexity of infinite words, Electronic Colloquium on Computational Complexity (EECC) 13, 70 (2006).
- C. S. Calude, S. Marcus, L. Staiger. A topological characterization of random sequences, Inform. Process. Lett. 88 (2003), 245–250.
- Staiger, L. "ω-Languages". In G. Rozenberg and A. Salomaa, editors, Handbook of Formal Languages, Volume 3, pages 339-387. Springer-Verlag, Berlin, 1997.
