= Michael Dinneen =

American mathematician and computer scientist

Michael J. Dinneen is an American-New Zealand mathematician and computer scientist working as a senior lecturer at the University of Auckland, New Zealand. He is deputy director of the Center for Discrete Mathematics and Theoretical Computer Science. He does research in combinatorial optimization, distributed computing, and graph theory.

Dinneen was educated at the University of Idaho (BS), Washington State University, and University of Victoria (MS and PhD). He worked at the Los Alamos National Laboratory before moving to New Zealand and the University of Auckland.

== Selected bibliography ==
- Michael J. Dinneen, Georgy Gimel'farb, and Mark C. Wilson. Introduction to Algorithms, Data Structures and Formal Languages. Pearson (Education New Zealand), 2004. ISBN 1-877258-79-2 (pages 253).
- Cristian S. Calude, Michael J. Dinneen, and Chi-Kou Shu. Computing a glimpse of randomness. "Experimental Mathematics", 11(2):369-378, 2002. http://www.cs.auckland.ac.nz/~cristian/Calude361_370.pdf
- Joshua J. Arulanandham, Cristian S. Calude, and Michael J. Dinneen. A fast natural algorithm for searching. "Theoretical Computer Science", 320(1):3-13, 2004. http://authors.elsevier.com/sd/article/S0304397504001914
- Michael J. Dinneen, Bakhadyr Khoussainov, André Nies (eds.). Computation, Physics and Beyond - International Workshop on Theoretical Computer Science, WTCS 2012, Dedicated to Cristian S. Calude on the Occasion of His 60th Birthday, Auckland, New Zealand, February 21–24, 2012, Revised Selected and Invited Papers. Lecture Notes in Computer Science 7160, Springer 2012. https://www.springer.com/gp/book/9783642276538
