= Edward F. Moore =

American mathematician and computer scientist

Edward Forrest Moore
- Born: November 23, 1925; Baltimore, Maryland
- Died: June 14, 2003 (aged 77); Madison, Wisconsin
- Known for: Moore machine

Academic background
- Education: Virginia Tech; Brown University

Edward Forrest Moore (November 23, 1925 – June 14, 2003) was an American professor of mathematics and computer science, the inventor of the Moore finite state machine, and an early pioneer of artificial life.

== Biography ==
Moore received a B.S. in chemistry from the Virginia Polytechnic Institute in Blacksburg, Virginia in 1947 and a Ph.D. in Mathematics from Brown University in Providence, Rhode Island in June 1950. He worked at the University of Illinois at Urbana–Champaign from 1950 to 1952 and was a visiting professor at MIT and visiting lecturer at Harvard University simultaneously in 1961-1962. He worked at Bell Labs from 1952 to 1966. After that, he was a professor at the University of Wisconsin–Madison from 1966 until he retired in 1985.

He married Elinor Constance Martin and they had three children.

== Scientific work ==
He was the first to use the type of finite-state machine (FSM) that is commonly used today, the Moore FSM. With Claude Shannon he did seminal work on computability theory and built reliable circuits using less reliable relays. He also spent a great deal of his later years on a fruitless effort to solve the Four Color Theorem.

With John Myhill, Moore proved the Garden of Eden theorem characterizing the cellular automaton rules that have patterns with no predecessor. He is also the namesake of the Moore neighborhood for cellular automata, used by Conway's Game of Life, and was the first to publish on the firing squad synchronization problem in cellular automata.

In a 1956 article in Scientific American, he proposed "Artificial Living Plants," which would be floating factories that could create copies of themselves. They could be programmed to perform some function (extracting fresh water, harvesting minerals from seawater) for an investment that would be relatively small compared to the huge returns from the exponentially growing numbers of factories.

Moore also asked which regular graphs can have their diameter matching a simple lower bound for the problem given by a regular tree with the same degree. The graphs matching this bound were named Moore graphs by Hoffman & Singleton (1960).

== Publications ==
With Claude Shannon, before and during his time at Bell Labs, he coauthored "Gedanken-experiments on sequential machines", "Computability by Probabilistic Machines", "Machine Aid for Switching Circuit Design", and "Reliable Circuits Using Less Reliable Relays".

At Bell Labs he authored "Variable Length Binary Encodings", "The Shortest Path Through a Maze", "A simplified universal Turing machine", and "Complete Relay Decoding Networks".

- "Machine models of self-reproduction," Proceedings of Symposia in Applied Mathematics, volume 14, pages 17–33. The American Mathematical Society, 1962.
- "Artificial Living Plants," Scientific American, (Oct 1956):118-126 JSTOR 24941788
- "Gedanken-experiments on Sequential Machines," pp 129 – 153, Automata Studies, Annals of Mathematics Studies, no. 34, Princeton University Press, Princeton, N. J., 1956

== See also ==
- Moore graph
- Breadth-first search
- Self-replicating machine
- Shortest Path Faster Algorithm
