= Firing squad synchronization problem =

Computer science problem

One solution to the FSSP using 15 states and 3n units of time. Time increases from top to bottom.

A solution using 2n-2 units of time. Time increases from bottom to top.

The firing squad synchronization problem is a problem in computer science and cellular automata in which the goal is to design a cellular automaton that, starting with a single active cell, eventually reaches a state in which all cells are simultaneously active. It was first proposed by John Myhill in 1957 and published (with a solution by John McCarthy and Marvin Minsky) in 1962 by Edward F. Moore.

== Problem statement ==
The name of the problem comes from an analogy with real-world firing squads: the goal is to design a system of rules according to which an officer can command an execution detail to fire so that its members fire their rifles simultaneously.

More formally, the problem concerns cellular automata, arrays of finite-state machines called cells arranged in a line, such that at each time step each machine transitions to a new state as a function of its previous state and the states of its two neighbors in the line. For the firing squad problem, the line consists of a finite number of cells, and the rule according to which each machine transitions to the next state should be the same for all of the cells interior to the line, but the transition functions of the two endpoints of the line are allowed to differ, as these two cells are each missing a neighbor on one of their two sides.

The states of each cell include three distinct states: active, quiescent, and firing, and the transition function must be such that a cell that is quiescent and whose neighbors are quiescent remains quiescent. Initially, at time t = 0, all states are quiescent except for the cell at the far left (the general), which is active. The goal is to design a set of states and a transition function such that, no matter how long the line of cells is, there exists a time t such that every cell transitions to the firing state at time t, and such that no cell belongs to the firing state prior to time t.

== Solutions ==
The first solution to the FSSP was found by John McCarthy and Marvin Minsky and was published in Sequential Machines by Moore. Their solution involves propagating two waves down the line of soldiers: a fast wave and a slow wave moving three times as slow. The fast wave bounces off the other end of the line and meets the slow wave in the centre. The two waves then split into four waves, a fast and slow wave moving in either direction from the centre, effectively splitting the line into two equal parts. This process continues, subdividing the line until each division is of length 1. At this moment, every soldier fires. This solution requires 3n units of time for n soldiers.

A solution using a minimal amount of time (which is 2n − 2 units of time for n soldiers), was first found by Eiichi Goto (1962), but his solution used thousands of states. Waksman (1966) improved this to 16 states, and Balzer (1967) further improved it to eight states, while claiming to prove that no four-state solution exists. Peter Sanders later found that Balzer's search procedure was incomplete, but managed to reaffirm the four-state non-existence result through a corrected search procedure. The best currently known solution, using six states, was introduced by Jacques Mazoyer (1987). It is still unknown whether a five-state solution exists.

In the minimal-time solutions, the general sends to the right signals S_{1}, S_{2}, S_{3}, ..., S_{i} at speeds 1, 1/3, 1/7, ..., 1/(2^{i−1} − 1). The signal S_{1} reflects at the right end of the line, and meets signal S_{i} (for i ≥ 2) at cell n/2^{i−1}. When S_{1} reflects, it also creates a new general at the right end. Signals S_{i} are constructed using auxiliary signals, which propagate to the left. Every second time a signal moves (to the right), it sends an auxiliary signal to the left. S_{1} moves on its own at speed 1 while each of the slower signals moves only when it gets an auxiliary signal.

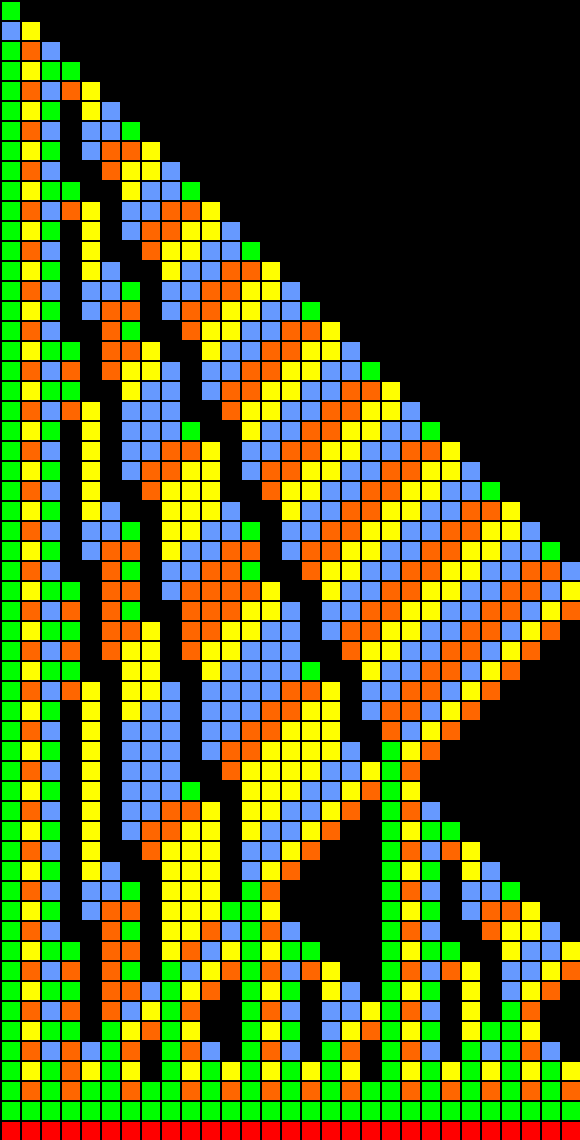
Mazoyer's solution using only 6 states, on a line of 29 cells (borders are not shown). Simultaneous firing happens at step 57.

== Generalizations ==
The firing squad synchronization problem has been generalized to many other types of cellular automaton, including higher-dimensional arrays of cells (Shinahr 1974). Variants of the problem with different initial conditions have also been considered (Kobayashi & Goldstein 2005). A solution of a generalized FSSP that is utilizing emergent information processing had been developed by (Kroc 2025), which could be used to develop implantable tissue engineered pacemakers, and in design of novel, emergent computers.

Solutions to the firing squad problem may also be adapted to other problems. For instance, Patrick Fischer (1965) designed a cellular automaton algorithm to generate the prime numbers based on an earlier solution to the firing squad synchronization problem.
