= Liquid War =

Open-source action game

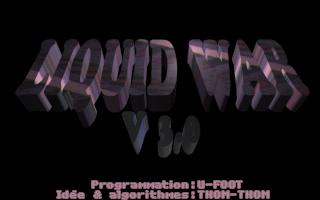
- Original authors: Christian Mauduit, Thomas Colcombet
- Initial release: 1995
- Stable release: 5.6.4 / October 17, 2007; 18 years ago
- Preview release: Liquid War 6 0.6.3902 / May 6, 2015; 10 years ago
- Repository: git.sv.gnu.org/liquidwar6.git
- Platform: Cross-platform
- Type: Game
- License: GPL-3.0-or-later
- Website: www.gnu.org/software/liquidwar6/

Liquid War is a free software multi-player action game based on particle flow mechanic. Thomas Colcombet developed the core concept and the original shortest path algorithm, the software was programmed by Christian Mauduit. Liquid War 6 is a GNU package distributed as free software and part of the GNU project.

== Gameplay ==
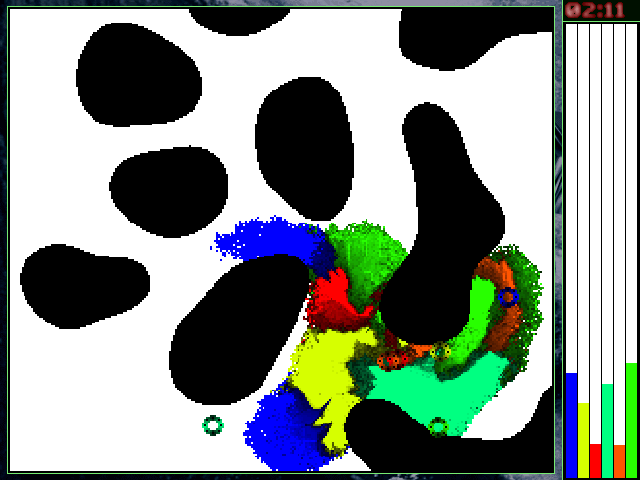
Liquid War in play with six teams. On the right is an information bar showing the relative size of the armies and a clock showing the time until the game expires.

Gameplay takes place on a 2D battlefield, usually with some obstacles. Each player (2 to 6, computer or human) has an army of particles and a cursor. The objective of the game is to assimilate all enemy particles. The players can only move their cursors and cannot directly control the particles. Each particle follows the shortest path around the obstacles to its team's cursor. A player may have several thousands particles at a time, giving the collection of particles a look of a liquid blob. When a particle moves into a particle from a different team, it will fight and if the opponent particle fails to fight back (it is not moving in the opposite direction) it will eventually be assimilated by its attacker. As particles cannot die but only change teams, the total number of particles on the map remains constant. Since a particle can only fight in one direction at a time (towards its team's cursor), a player that surrounds its opponents will have a distinct advantage. The game ends when one player controls all of the particles or when the time runs out. When the time runs out, the player with the most particles wins.

There are multiple maps which affect the obstacles in the battlefield. These obstacles may affect the strategies of the game.

Liquid War is a multiplayer game and can be played by up to 6 people on one computer, or over the Internet or a LAN. A single player mode is available in which the opponents are controlled by the computer. The computer AI's "strategy" is to constantly choose a random point in the enemy and move its cursor to it.

== History ==
The Liquid War shortest path algorithm was invented by Thomas Colcombet before the game itself in Spring 1995. The game came as a result of the algorithm, when he realized its applicability to gaming. Colcombet's friend, Christian Mauduit, enhanced the algorithm and coded the game.

Liquid War 3.0 was released on 1 July 1995. It was a "barely usable" MS-DOS game with no network support. Version 5.0 was released on 26 September 1998. It was a complete rewrite and used the Allegro library. Network support was introduced in version 5.4.0, released on 7 July 2001. As of July 2008, the current stable version is 5.6.4 and is available under MS-DOS, Microsoft Windows, Mac OS X, Linux and FreeBSD. Its author, Christian Mauduit, has announced that a complete rewrite is in progress to produce version 6.0, which will abandon the Allegro used for 5.x releases for a full OpenGL implementation. Version 6.0 is a part of the GNU project and was expected to be released in 2008. Version 0.0.7 beta, a testing version, was released in October 2009. Version 0.0.8 beta was released in 2010. Most parts of the game and engine are finished, and playing hotseat and/or against bots works fine, just like version 5.x. Network mode is in prototype stage.

== Reception ==
In 2000 a CNN article on Linux games highlighted the fun with Liquid War. In 2002, Liquid War received the "Most Original Linux Game" award by The Linux Game Tome, and in 2003 it was nominated for the Les Trophées du Libre, an International Free Software Competition. Liquid War was also distributed by various download portals, for instance computerbild.de counted 20,000 downloads.

== Similar software ==
A mobile adaptation titled Liquid Wars has been developed for the Android operating system, inspired by the mechanics of the original game. It makes use of multitouch input, allowing players to split their particle armies and attack from multiple sides simultaneously.

== Literature ==
- Mauduit, Christian. "Liquid war 5 documentation".
- Mauduit, Christian. "Liquid war 6 documentation".

== See also ==
- List of open-source video games
