= Mikołaj Bojańczyk =

Polish theoretical computer scientist and logician

- Born: June 8, 1977 (age 49)
- Education: Warsaw University
- Known for: Tree walking automata
- Awards: Presburger Award (2010); Kuratowski Prize (2007)
- Scientific career
- Fields: Automata theory; Logic in computer science
- Workplaces: Warsaw University
- Doctoral advisor: Igor Walukiewicz
- Website: www.mimuw.edu.pl/~bojan/

Mikołaj Bojańczyk (born 1977) is a Polish theoretical computer scientist and logician known for settling open problems on tree walking automata jointly with Thomas Colcombet, and for contributions to logic in automata theory. He is a professor at Warsaw University.

== Biography ==
Bojańczyk earned his doctorate from Warsaw University in 2004. In 2004–2005, he spent a year at Paris Diderot University. He got his habilitation from Warsaw University in 2008 and has been a full professor there since 2014. Bojańczyk became the first recipient of the Presburger Award in 2010.
