= Anil Nerode =

American mathematician

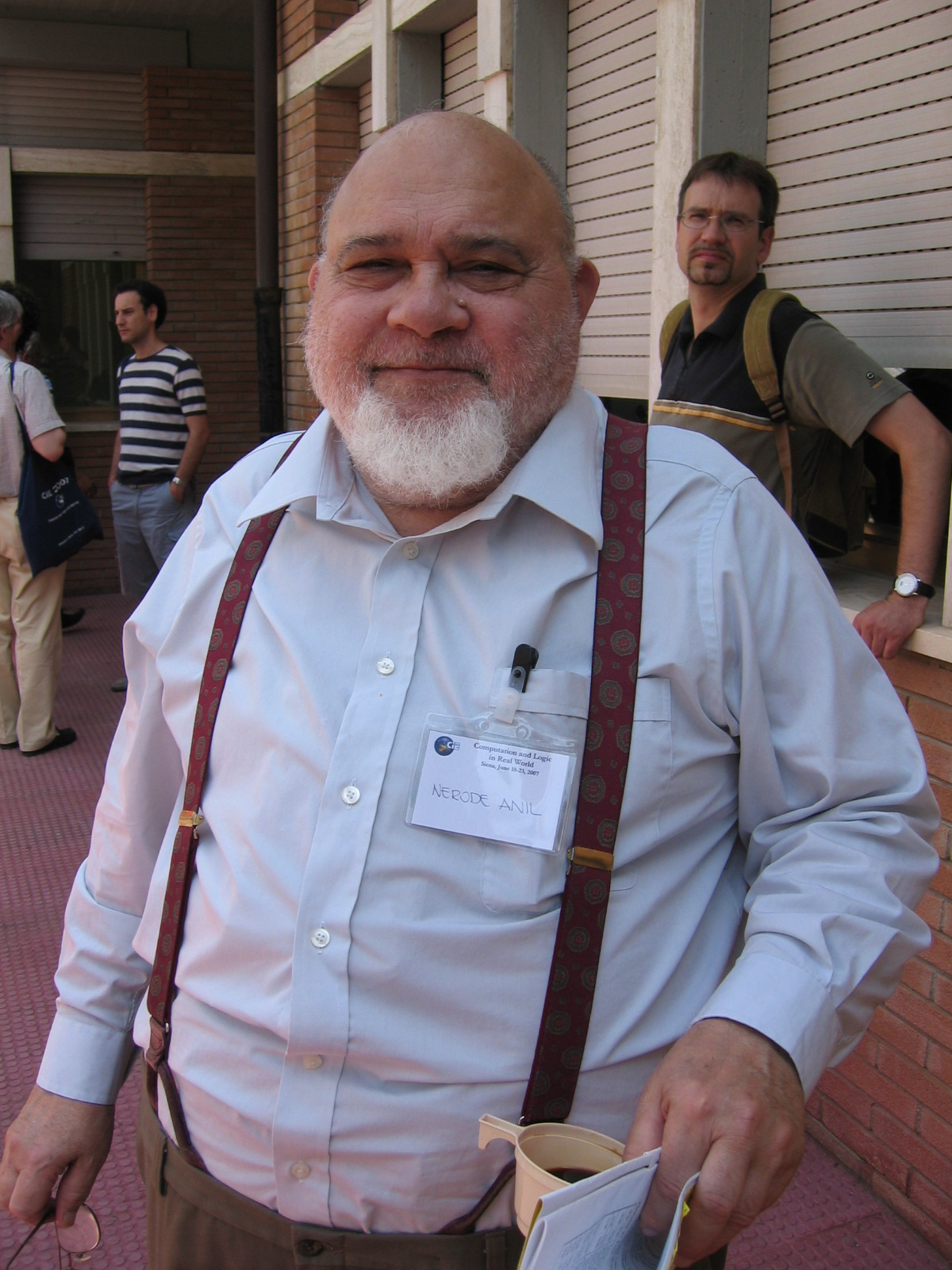
Nerode in 2007

Anil Nerode (born 1932) is an American mathematician, known for his work in mathematical logic and for his many-decades tenure as a professor at Cornell University.

He received his undergraduate education and a Ph.D. in mathematics from the University of Chicago, the latter under the directions of Saunders Mac Lane. He enrolled in the Hutchins College at the University of Chicago in 1947 at the age of 15, and received his Ph.D. in 1956. His Ph.D. thesis was on an algebraic abstract formulation of substitution in many-sorted free algebras and its relation to equational definitions of the partial recursive functions.

While in graduate school, beginning in 1954, he worked at Professor Walter Bartky's Institute for Air Weapons Research, which did classified work for the US Air Force. He continued to work there following the completion of his Ph.D., from 1956 to 1957. In the summer of 1957 he attended the Cornell NSF Summer 1957 Institute in Logic. In 1958 to 1959 he went to the Institute for Advanced Study in Princeton, New Jersey, where he worked with Kurt Gödel. He also did post-graduate work at University of California, Berkeley.

When in 1959 he got an unsolicited offer of a faculty position at Cornell University, he accepted, in part because on his previous visit to the campus he had thought "it was the prettiest place I'd ever seen". Nerode is a distinguished professor of arts and sciences in mathematics at Cornell. He was formerly Goldwin Smith Professor of Mathematics at Cornell, having been named to that chair in 1991. His interests are in mathematical logic, the theory of automata, computability and complexity theory, the calculus of variations, and distributed systems. With John Myhill, Nerode proved the Myhill–Nerode theorem specifying necessary and sufficient conditions for a formal language to be regular. With Bakhadyr Khoussainov, Nerode founded the theory of automatic structures, an extension of the theory of automatic groups.

The academic year 2019–20 saw Nerode's 60th year as an active faculty member at Cornell, which the university said was its longest such tenure ever. In 2022, the Nerode-90 conference was held online to celebrate his contributions to the field.

Nerode is an editorial board member of the journals Annals of Mathematics and Artificial Intelligence, Mathematical and Computer Modelling, Documenta Mathematica and others.

In 2012 he became a fellow of the American Mathematical Society.
