= Thomas Colcombet =

French theoretical computer scientist

- Born: March 6, 1975 (age 51)
- Education: University of Rennes 1
- Known for: tree walking automata, Liquid War
- Awards: Bronze medal of the CNRS (2010)
- Scientific career
- Fields: Theoretical computer science Automata theory
- Workplaces: Paris Diderot University
- Doctoral advisor: Didier Caucal

Thomas Colcombet (born March 6, 1975) is a French theoretical computer scientist known for settling major open problems on tree walking automata jointly with Mikołaj Bojańczyk. Colcombet is currently a CNRS Research Director at Paris Cité University.

== Biography ==
Colcombet earned his undergraduate degree from École normale supérieure de Lyon (2000) and his doctorate from University of Rennes 1 (2004). Since 2004, he is a CNRS researcher, and a Research Director since 2016. He received the CNRS Bronze Medal in 2010.

Besides his work on tree walking automata, Colcombet contributed to ω-automata, particularly to state complexity of Büchi automata, and to various topics in logic in computer science.

He was involved in the development of the videogame Liquid War.
