= Karl Svozil =

Austrian physicist (born 1956)

- Born: 18 December 1956 (age 69); Vienna, Austria
- Education: University of Vienna; Heidelberg University
- Known for: Theoretical Physics
- Scientific career
- Fields: Physicist
- Workplaces: Vienna University of Technology

Karl Svozil (born 18 December 1956) is an Austrian physicist educated at the University of Vienna and Heidelberg University. Visiting scholar at the Lawrence Berkeley Laboratory of the University of California at Berkeley, US (1982–1983), the Lebedev Institute of the Moscow State University, and the Ioffe Institute, St. Petersburg (1986). Docent in Theoretical Physics at the Vienna Technical University. Ao. Univ. Professor at the Institute for Theoretical Physics of the Vienna Technical University. External Researcher at the Centre for Discrete Mathematics and Theoretical Computer Science of the University of Auckland.

Research in quantum theory, applications of computability theory, algorithmic information theory, constructive mathematics (in Errett Bishop's sense) in theoretical physics, equilibrium dynamics.

== Selected bibliography ==
- Svozil, Karl (1 September 1998). Quantum Logic. Springer Science & Business Media. ISBN 978-981-4021-07-4.
- Svozil, Karl (1993). Randomness and Undecidability in Physics. WORLD SCIENTIFIC. Bibcode:1993rup..book.....S. doi:10.1142/1524. ISBN 978-981-02-0809-7.
- Svozil, Karl (2023). UFOs: Unidentified Aerial Phenomena: Observations, Explanations and Speculations. Cham: Springer International Publishing. Bibcode:2023uuap.book.....S. doi:10.1007/978-3-031-34398-8. ISBN 978-3-031-34397-1.
