= Carlos Staiger =

Entrepreneur in the industrial and agricultural economic sectors

Carlos Staiger (born Karl Staiger; 1907 in Eningen unter Achalm – 1997 in Porto Alegre) was an entrepreneur in the industrial and agricultural economic sectors.

He emigrated from Germany to Brazil in the 1930s.

Staiger also founded several important associations and wrote a book named O Capital Humano.
