= Sophie Tison =

French computer scientist

Sophie Tison (born 1958) is a retired French computer scientist, a professor emerita of computer science in the Faculty of Science and Technology at the University of Lille. Her research concerns rewriting^{[A]}^{[C]} and tree automata.^{[B]}^{[C]}^{[D]}

== Education and career ==
Tison studied mathematics at the École Normale Supérieure de Fontenay-aux-Roses, at the time a higher education institution reserved for women. She defended a doctoral thesis in 1983, and received a habilitation in 1990.

She joined the academic staff at the Lille University of Science and Technology (later merged into the University of Lille) in 1982, rising through the ranks of assistant, master assistant, maître de conférence, and finally professor, before her retirement as a professor emerita. She became deputy director of the Laboratoire d’Informatique Fondamentale de Lille (LIFL) from 2001 to 2007, and director from 2008 until its merger with another laboratory to form CRISTAL (the Centre de Recherche en Informatique, Signal et Automatique de Lille) in 2014. She became vice-president for partnerships, innovation, and valorization of the Lille University of Science and Technology in 2015.

== Recognition ==
Tison received the 2018 Grand Prize Kühlmann of the Lille Society of Science, Agriculture and the Arts, for her work in the advancement of science. She was named as a knight (chevalier) in the Ordre national du Mérite in 2023.

== Selected publications ==
Tison was the program chair and proceedings editor of CAAP 1994 (the 19th International Colloquium on Trees in Algebra and Programming) and RTA 2002 (the 13th International Conference on Rewriting Techniques and Applications). She was cochair and coeditor of STACS 1999 and STACS 2000 (the 16th and 17th Annual Symposium on Theoretical Aspects of Computer Science).

Her publications include:

A.	Dauchet, Max; Tison, Sophie (1990), "The theory of ground rewrite systems is decidable", Proceedings of the Fifth Annual Symposium on Logic in Computer Science (LICS '90), Philadelphia, Pennsylvania, USA, June 4–7, 1990, IEEE Computer Society, pp. 242–248, doi:10.1109/LICS.1990.113750

B.	Bogaert, Bruno; Tison, Sophie (1992), "Equality and disequality constraints on direct subterms in tree automata", in Finkel, Alain; Jantzen, Matthias (eds.), STACS 92, 9th Annual Symposium on Theoretical Aspects of Computer Science, Cachan, France, February 13–15, 1992, Proceedings, Lecture Notes in Computer Science, vol. 577, Springer, pp. 161–171, doi:10.1007/3-540-55210-3_181

C.	Gilleron, Rémy; Tison, Sophie (1995), "Regular tree languages and rewrite systems", Fundamenta Informaticae, 24 (1–2): 157–175, doi:10.3233/fi-1995-24127, MR 1364534

D.	Comon, Hubert; Dauchet, Max; Gilleron, Rémi; Jacquemard, Florent; Lugiez, Denis; Löding, Christof; Tison, Sophie; Tommasi, Marc (2008), Tree Automata Techniques and Applications, HAL
