= Regular tree grammar =

Formal grammar

In theoretical computer science and formal language theory, a regular tree grammar is a formal grammar that describes a set of directed trees, or terms. A regular word grammar can be seen as a special kind of regular tree grammar, describing a set of single-path trees.

== Definition ==
A regular tree grammar G is defined by the tuple G = (N, Σ, Z, P), where:

- N is a finite set of nonterminals,
- Σ is a ranked alphabet (i.e., an alphabet whose symbols have an associated arity) disjoint from N,
- Z is the starting nonterminal, with Z ∈ N, and
- P is a finite set of productions of the form A → t, with A ∈ N, and t ∈ T_{Σ}(N), where T_{Σ}(N) is the associated term algebra, i.e. the set of all trees composed from symbols in Σ ∪ N according to their arities, where nonterminals are considered nullary.

== Derivation of trees ==
The grammar G implicitly defines a set of trees: any tree that can be derived from Z using the rule set P is said to be described by G. This set of trees is known as the language of G. Formally, the relation ⇒_{G} on the set T_{Σ}(N) is defined as follows:

A tree t_{1}∈ T_{Σ}(N) can be derived in a single step into a tree t_{2} ∈ T_{Σ}(N) (in short: t_{1} ⇒_{G} t_{2}), if there is a context S and a production (A→t) ∈ P such that:

- t_{1} = S[A], and
- t_{2} = S[t].

Here, a context means a tree with exactly one hole in it; if S is such a context, S[t] denotes the result of filling the tree t into the hole of S.

The tree language generated by G is the language L(G) = { t ∈ T_{Σ} | Z ⇒_{G*} t }.

Here, T_{Σ} denotes the set of all trees composed from symbols of Σ, while ⇒_{G*} denotes successive applications of ⇒_{G}.

A language generated by some regular tree grammar is called a regular tree language.

== Examples ==
Example derivation tree from G_{1} in linear (upper left table) and graphical (main picture) notation

Let G_{1} = (N_{1},Σ_{1},Z_{1},P_{1}), where

- N_{1} = {Bool, BList } is our set of nonterminals,
- Σ_{1} = { true, false, nil, cons(.,.) } is our ranked alphabet, arities indicated by dummy arguments (i.e. the symbol cons has arity 2),
- Z_{1} = BList is our starting nonterminal, and
- the set P_{1} consists of the following productions:
  - Bool → false
  - Bool → true
  - BList → nil
  - BList → cons(Bool,BList)

An example derivation from the grammar G_{1} is

BList ⇒ cons(Bool,BList) ⇒ cons(false,cons(Bool,BList)) ⇒ cons(false,cons(true,nil)).

The image shows the corresponding derivation tree; it is a tree of trees (main picture), whereas a derivation tree in word grammars is a tree of strings (upper left table).

The tree language generated by G_{1} is the set of all finite lists of boolean values, that is, L(G_{1}) happens to equal T_{Σ1}. The grammar G_{1} corresponds to the algebraic data type declarations (in the Standard ML programming language):

datatype Bool
  = false
  | true
datatype BList
  = nil
  | cons of Bool * BList

Every member of L(G_{1}) corresponds to a Standard-ML value of type BList.

For another example, let G_{2} = (N_{1}, Σ_{1}, BList_{1}, P_{1} ∪ P_{2}), using the nonterminal set and the alphabet from above, but extending the production set by P_{2}, consisting of the following productions:

- BList_{1} → cons(true,BList)
- BList_{1} → cons(false,BList_{1})

The language L(G_{2}) is the set of all finite lists of boolean values that contain true at least once. The set L(G_{2}) has no datatype counterpart in Standard ML, nor in any other functional language. It is a proper subset of L(G_{1}). The above example term happens to be in L(G_{2}), too, as the following derivation shows:

BList_{1} ⇒ cons(false,BList_{1}) ⇒ cons(false,cons(true,BList)) ⇒ cons(false,cons(true,nil)).

== Language properties ==
If L_{1}, L_{2} both are regular tree languages, then the tree sets L_{1} ∩ L_{2}, L_{1} ∪ L_{2}, and L_{1} \ L_{2} are also regular tree languages, and it is decidable whether L_{1} ⊆ L_{2}, and whether L_{1} = L_{2}.

== Alternative characterizations and relation to other formal languages ==
- Regular tree grammars are a generalization of regular word grammars.
- The regular tree languages are also the languages recognized by bottom-up tree automata and nondeterministic top-down tree automata.
- Rajeev Alur and Parthasarathy Madhusudan related a subclass of regular binary tree languages to nested words and visibly pushdown languages.

== Applications ==
Applications of regular tree grammars include:

- Instruction selection in compiler code generation
- A decision procedure for the first-order logic theory of formulas over equality (=) and set membership (∈) as the only predicates
- Solving constraints about mathematical sets
- The set of all truths expressible in first-order logic about a finite algebra (which is always a regular tree language)
- Graph-search

== See also ==
- Set constraint – a generalization of regular tree grammars
- Tree-adjoining grammar
