= Japan Advanced Institute of Science and Technology =

Postgraduate university in Nomi, Ishikawa

Coordinates: 36°26′40.3″N 136°35′33.5″E

Japan Advanced Institute of Science and Technology (JAIST)
- Motto: Open the New Frontiers of Science and Technology
- Type: Public (National)
- Established: October 1990
- President: Minoru Terano
- Administrative staff: faculty members 158 / office workers 141
- Undergraduates: None
- Postgraduates: 1218
- Location: Nomi, Ishikawa, Japan
- Campus: suburban, 102,042 (in square meters)
- Website: www.jaist.ac.jp/english/

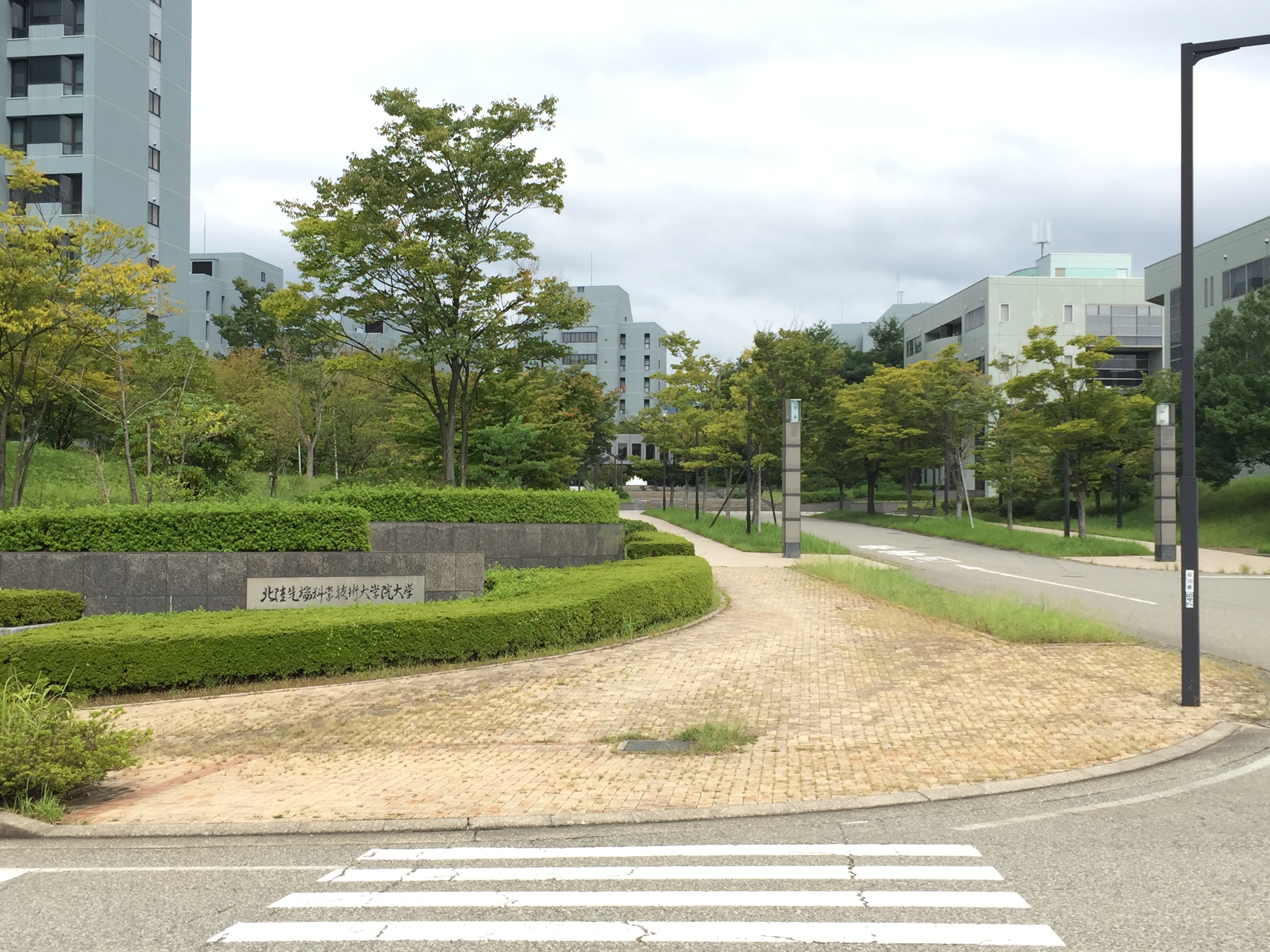
Entrance to JAIST

The Japan Advanced Institute of Science and Technology (北陸先端科学技術大学院大学, hokuriku sentan kagaku gijutsu daigakuin daigaku; JAIST) is a postgraduate university in Nomi, Ishikawa, established in 1990.

JAIST was established in the centre of Ishikawa Science Park (ISP). JAIST has programs of advanced research and development in science and technology. This university has several satellite campuses: Shinagawa Campus in Shinagawa, Tokyo (relocated from its earlier Tamachi Campus in Minato, Tokyo), open course in Information Technology and Management of Technology (MOT), and satellite lectures in Kanazawa City and Toyama City.

In The 21st Century Center Of Excellence Program, JSPS granted two programs to JAIST. One program is the "Technology Creation based on Knowledge Science" (知識科学に基づく科学技術の創造と実践, chishiki kagaku ni motoduku kagaku-gijyutsu no sōzō to jissen) (2003), and the other program is "Verifiable and Evolvable E-Society" (検証進化可能電子社会, kenshō shinka kanō denshi shakai) (2004).

== History ==
- 1989 A committee was organized at Tokyo Institute of Technology for foundation of a research-intensive university in Ishikawa Prefecture (Hokuriku region).
- 1990 JAIST was founded in Japan as Japan's first postgraduate university without undergraduate faculty. Graduate School of Information Science was organized. The Institute Library was constructed.
- 1991 Graduate School of Materials Science was organized. The Center for Information Science was established.
- 1992 The Center for New Materials was established.
- 1993 The Center for Research and Investigation of Advanced Science and Technology was established.
- 1994 The Health Care Center was established.
- 1996 The Institute Library opens. Graduate School of Knowledge Science was organized.
- 1998 The Center for Knowledge Science was established.
- 2001 The Research Center for Remote Learning was established. The Internet Research Center was established.
- 2002 The Center for Nano Materials and Technology was established, as the result of reorganization of the Center for New Materials. The Venture Business Laboratory was established.
- 2003 The IP (Intellectual Property) Operation Center was established. The Center for Strategic Development of Science and Technology was established.
- 2004 JAIST was incorporated as a National University Corporation. The Research Center for Trustworthy e-Society was established.
- 2005 JAIST held the 15th anniversary ceremony.
- 2007 The Research Center for Integrated Science was established. The Center for Highly Dependable Embedded System Technology was established.

== Research departments ==
- Graduate School of Information Science
  - Department of Information Science
- Graduate School of Materials Science
  - Department of Materials Science
- Graduate School of Knowledge Science
  - Department of Knowledge Science
- 9 Research Areas from April 2016.
  - Human life design area
  - Knowledge Management
  - Security and Networks
  - Intelligence Robotics
  - Entertainment Technology
  - Energy and Environment
  - Materials Chemistry
  - Applied Physics
  - Bio-science and Biotechnology

All individual schools have MSc and Ph.D. programs. The MSc programs standard term is two to three years and the Ph.D. programs' standard term length is three years.

== Rankings ==
JAIST has been ranked highly amongst Japanese universities, coming 26th in Japan in the Webometrics Ranking of World Universities (and 871st in the world). In UniRank's 2017 ranking of Japanese universities, JAIST came in 25th place and 130th in Asia.
