= Ranked alphabet =

In theoretical computer science and formal language theory, a ranked alphabet is a pair of an ordinary alphabet F and a function Arity: F→$\mathbb{N}$. Each letter in F has its arity so it can be used to build terms. Nullary elements (of zero arity) are also called constants. Terms built with unary symbols and constants can be considered as strings. Higher arities lead to proper trees.

For instance, in the term

$$f(a,g(a),f(a,b,c))$$,

a,b,c are constants, g is unary, and f is ternary.

Contrariwise,

$$f(a,f(a))$$

cannot be a valid term, as the symbol f appears once as binary, and once as unary, which is illicit, as Arity must be a function.
