= Algorithmic state machine =

Method in programming

The algorithmic state machine (ASM) is a method for designing finite-state machines (FSMs) originally developed by Thomas E. Osborne at the University of California, Berkeley (UCB) since 1960, introduced to and implemented at Hewlett-Packard in 1968, formalized and expanded since 1967 and written about by Christopher R. Clare since 1970. It is used to represent diagrams of digital integrated circuits. The ASM diagram is like a state diagram but more structured and, thus, easier to understand. An ASM chart is a method of describing the sequential operations of a digital system.

== ASM method ==
The ASM method is composed of the following steps:

1. Create an algorithm, using pseudocode, to describe the desired operation of the device.
2. Convert the pseudocode into an ASM chart.
3. Design the datapath based on the ASM chart.
4. Create a detailed ASM chart based on the datapath.
5. Design the control logic based on the detailed ASM chart.

== ASM chart ==
An ASM chart consists of an interconnection of four types of basic elements: state name, state box, decision box, and conditional outputs box. An ASM state, represented as a rectangle, corresponds to one state of a regular state diagram or finite-state machine. The Moore type outputs are listed inside the box.

State Name

State Name: The name of the state is indicated inside the circle and the circle is placed in the top left corner or the name is placed without the circle.

State box

State Box: The output of the state is indicated inside the rectangle box

Decision box used in an ASM chart

Decision Box: A diamond indicates that the stated condition/expression is to be tested and the exit path is to be chosen accordingly. The condition expression contains one or more inputs to the FSM. An ASM condition check, indicated by a diamond with one input and two outputs (for true and false), is used to conditionally transfer between two State Boxes, to another Decision Box, or to a Conditional Output Box. The decision box contains the stated condition expression to be tested, the expression contains one or more inputs of the FSM.

Conditional output box

Conditional Output Box: An oval denotes the output signals that are of Mealy type. These outputs depend not only on the state but also the inputs to the FSM.

== Datapath ==
Once the desired operation of a circuit has been described using RTL operations, the datapath components may be derived. Every unique variable that is assigned a value in the RTL program can be implemented as a register. Depending on the functional operation performed when assigning a value to a variable, the register for that variable may be implemented as a straightforward register, a shift register, a counter, or a register preceded by a combinational logic block. The combinational logic block associated with a register may implement an adder, subtractor, multiplexer, or some other type of combinational logic function.

== Detailed ASM chart ==
Once the datapath is designed, the ASM chart is converted to a detailed ASM chart. The RTL notation is replaced by signals defined in the datapath.

== See also ==
- Flowchart
- Drakon-chart
- Mealy machine
- Moore machine
- Map-entered variables (MEV)
