= Event-driven =

Event driven may refer to:

The term event-driven refers to a methodology that focuses on events and event dependencies.

== Examples include ==
- Event-driven finite-state machine, finite-state machine where the transition from one state to another is triggered by an event or a message
- Event-driven programming, a programming paradigm in which the flow of the program is determined by events, and is often characterised by a main loop, event handlers, and asynchronous programming
- Event-driven architecture, a software architecture pattern promoting the production, detection, consumption of, and reaction to events
- Event-driven investing, a hedge fund investment strategy that seeks to exploit pricing inefficiencies that may occur before or after a corporate event
- Event-driven process chains, a type of flowchart used for business process modelling
- Workflows, a sequence of connected steps
