= Finite-state machine =

Mathematical model of computation

Classes of automata

In theoretical computer science, a finite-state machine (FSM) or finite-state automaton (FSA, plural: automata), finite automaton, or simply a state machine, is a mathematical model of computation. It is an abstract machine that can be in exactly one of a finite number of states at any given time. The FSM can change from one state to another in response to some inputs; the change from one state to another is called a transition. An FSM is defined by a list of its states, its initial state, and the inputs that trigger each transition. Finite-state machines are of two types—deterministic finite-state machines and non-deterministic finite-state machines. For any non-deterministic finite-state machine, an equivalent deterministic one can be constructed.

The finite-state machine has less computational power than some other models of computation such as the Turing machine. The computational power distinction means there are computational tasks that a Turing machine can do but an FSM cannot. This is because an FSM's memory is limited by the number of states it has. A finite-state machine has the same computational power as a Turing machine that is restricted such that its head may only perform "read" operations, and always has to move from left to right. FSMs are studied in the more general field of automata theory.

Some physical realizations of FSM produce outputs, which are often used as control signals to perform certain actions. The behavior of state machines can be observed in many devices in modern society that perform a predetermined sequence of actions depending on a sequence of events with which they are presented. Simple examples are vending machines, which dispense products when the proper combination of coins is deposited; elevators, whose sequence of stops is determined by the floors requested by riders; traffic lights, which change sequence when cars are waiting; and combination locks, which require the input of a sequence of numbers in the proper order.

== Example: coin-operated turnstile ==
State diagram for a turnstile

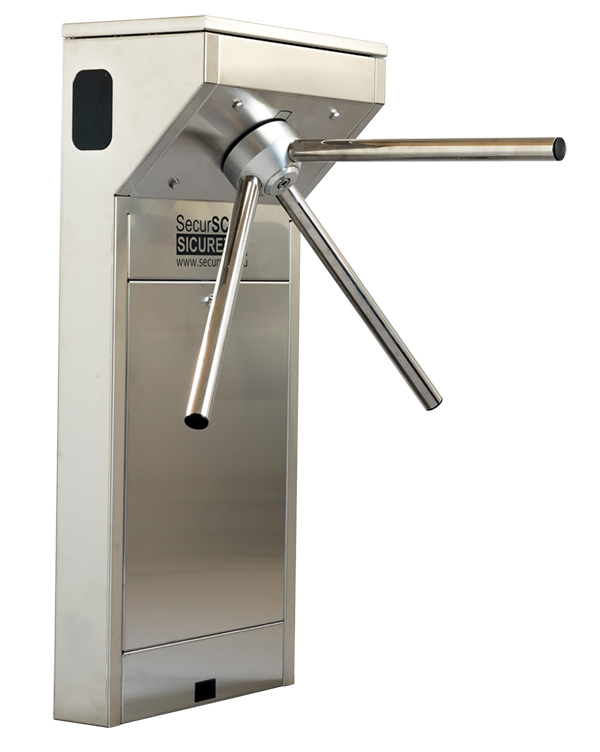
A turnstile

An example of a simple mechanism that can be modeled by a state machine is a turnstile. A turnstile, used to control access to subways and amusement park rides, is a gate with three rotating arms at waist height, one across the entryway. Initially the arms are locked, blocking the entry, preventing patrons from passing through. Depositing a coin or token in a slot on the turnstile unlocks the arms, allowing a single customer to push through. After the customer passes through, the arms are locked again until another coin is inserted.

Considered as a state machine, the turnstile has two possible states: Locked and Unlocked. There are two possible inputs that affect its state: putting a coin in the slot (coin) and pushing the arm (push). In the locked state, pushing on the arm has no effect; no matter how many times the input push is given, it stays in the locked state. Putting a coin in – that is, giving the machine a coin input – shifts the state from Locked to Unlocked. In the unlocked state, putting additional coins in has no effect; that is, giving additional coin inputs does not change the state. A customer pushing through the arms gives a push input and resets the state to Locked.

The turnstile state machine can be represented by a state-transition table, showing for each possible state, the transitions between them (based upon the inputs given to the machine) and the outputs resulting from each input:

Current State	Input	Next State	Output
Locked	coin	Unlocked	Unlocks the turnstile so that the customer can push through.
Locked	push	Locked	None
Unlocked	coin	Unlocked	None
Unlocked	push	Locked	When the customer has pushed through, locks the turnstile.

The turnstile state machine can also be represented by a directed graph called a state diagram (above). Each state is represented by a node (circle). Edges (arrows) show the transitions from one state to another. Each arrow is labeled with the input that triggers that transition. An input that doesn't cause a change of state (such as a coin input in the Unlocked state) is represented by a circular arrow returning to the original state. The arrow into the Locked node from the black dot indicates it is the initial state.

== Concepts and terminology ==
A state is a description of the status of a system that is waiting to execute a transition. A transition is a set of actions to be executed when a condition is fulfilled or when an event is received. For example, when using an audio system to listen to the radio (the system is in the "radio" state), receiving a "next" stimulus results in moving to the next station. When the system is in the "CD" state, the "next" stimulus results in moving to the next track. Identical stimuli trigger different actions depending on the current state.

In some finite-state machine representations, it is also possible to associate actions with a state:

- an entry action: performed when entering the state, and
- an exit action: performed when exiting the state.

== Representations ==
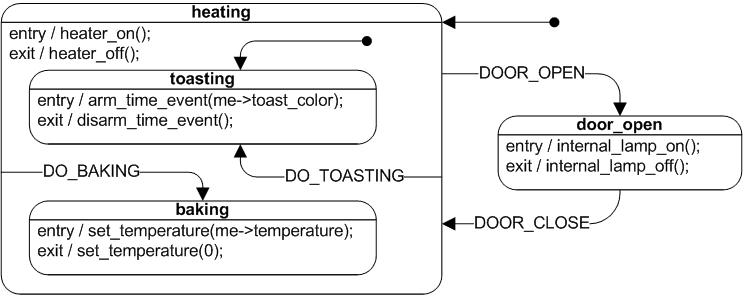
Fig. 1 UML state chart example (a toaster oven)

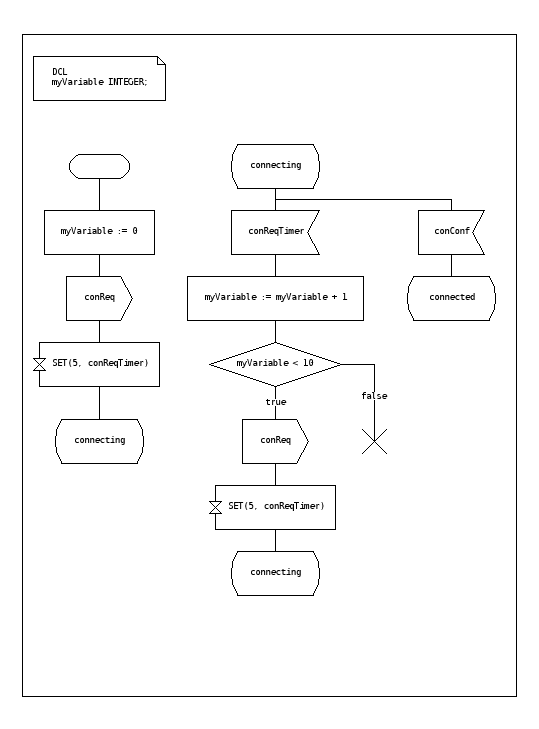
Fig. 2 SDL state machine example

Fig. 3 Example of a simple finite-state machine

=== State/Event table ===
Several state-transition table types are used. The most common representation is shown below: the combination of current state (e.g. B) and input (e.g. Y) shows the next state (e.g. C). By itself, the table cannot completely describe the action, so it is common to use footnotes. Other related representations may not have this limitation. For example, an FSM definition including the full action's information is possible using state tables (see also virtual finite-state machine).

State-transition table
Current state Input	State A	State B	State C
Input X	...	...	...
Input Y	...	State C	...
Input Z	...	...	...

=== UML state machines ===
The Unified Modeling Language has a notation for describing state machines. UML state machines overcome the limitations of traditional finite-state machines while retaining their main benefits. UML state machines introduce the new concepts of hierarchically nested states and orthogonal regions, while extending the notion of actions. UML state machines have the characteristics of both Mealy machines and Moore machines. They support actions that depend on both the state of the system and the triggering event, as in Mealy machines, as well as entry and exit actions, which are associated with states rather than transitions, as in Moore machines.

=== SDL state machines ===
The Specification and Description Language is a standard from ITU that includes graphical symbols to describe actions in the transition:

- send an event
- receive an event
- start a timer
- cancel a timer
- start another concurrent state machine
- decision

SDL embeds basic data types called "Abstract Data Types", an action language, and an execution semantic in order to make the finite-state machine executable.

=== Other state diagrams ===
There are a large number of variants to represent an FSM such as the one in figure 3.

== Usage ==
In addition to their use in modeling reactive systems presented here, finite-state machines are significant in many different areas, including electrical engineering, linguistics, computer science, philosophy, biology, mathematics, video game programming, and logic. Finite-state machines are a class of automata studied in automata theory and the theory of computation. In computer science, finite-state machines are widely used in modeling of application behavior (control theory), design of hardware digital systems, software engineering, compilers, network protocols, and computational linguistics.

== Classification ==
Finite-state machines can be subdivided into acceptors, classifiers, transducers and sequencers.

=== Acceptors ===
Fig. 4: Acceptor FSM: parsing the string "nice".

Fig. 5: Representation of an acceptor; this example shows one that determines whether a binary number has an even number of 0s, where S_{1} is an accepting state and S_{2} is a non accepting state.

Acceptors (also called detectors or recognizers) produce binary output, indicating whether or not the received input is accepted. Each state of an acceptor is either accepting or non accepting. Once all input has been received, if the current state is an accepting state, the input is accepted; otherwise it is rejected. As a rule, input is a sequence of symbols (characters); actions are not used. The start state can also be an accepting state, in which case the acceptor accepts the empty string. The example in figure 4 shows an acceptor that accepts the string "nice". In this acceptor, the only accepting state is state 7.

A (possibly infinite) set of symbol sequences, called a formal language, is a regular language if there is some acceptor that accepts exactly that set. For example, the set of binary strings with an even number of zeroes is a regular language (cf. Fig. 5), while the set of all strings whose length is a prime number is not.

An acceptor could also be described as defining a language that would contain every string accepted by the acceptor but none of the rejected ones; that language is accepted by the acceptor. By definition, the languages accepted by acceptors are the regular languages.

The problem of determining the language accepted by a given acceptor is an instance of the algebraic path problem—itself a generalization of the shortest path problem to graphs with edges weighted by the elements of an (arbitrary) semiring.

An example of an accepting state appears in Fig. 5: a deterministic finite automaton (DFA) that detects whether the binary input string contains an even number of 0s.

S_{1} (which is also the start state) indicates the state at which an even number of 0s has been input. S_{1} is therefore an accepting state. This acceptor will finish in an accept state, if the binary string contains an even number of 0s (including any binary string containing no 0s). Examples of strings accepted by this acceptor are ε (the empty string), 1, 11, 11..., 00, 010, 1010, 10110, etc.

=== Classifiers ===
Classifiers are a generalization of acceptors that produce n-ary output where n is strictly greater than two.

=== Transducers ===
Fig. 6 Transducer FSM: Moore model example

Fig. 7 Transducer FSM: Mealy model example

Transducers produce output based on a given input and/or a state using actions. They are used for control applications and in the field of computational linguistics.

In control applications, two types are distinguished:

Moore machine
The FSM uses only entry actions, i.e., output depends only on state. The advantage of the Moore model is a simplification of the behaviour. Consider an elevator door. The state machine recognizes two commands: "command_open" and "command_close", which trigger state changes. The entry action (E:) in state "Opening" starts a motor opening the door, the entry action in state "Closing" starts a motor in the other direction closing the door. States "Opened" and "Closed" stop the motor when fully opened or closed. They signal to the outside world (e.g., to other state machines) the situation: "door is open" or "door is closed".

Mealy machine
The FSM also uses input actions, i.e., output depends on input and state. The use of a Mealy FSM leads often to a reduction of the number of states. The example in figure 7 shows a Mealy FSM implementing the same behaviour as in the Moore example (the behaviour depends on the implemented FSM execution model and will work, e.g., for virtual FSM but not for event-driven FSM). There are two input actions (I:): "start motor to close the door if command_close arrives" and "start motor in the other direction to open the door if command_open arrives". The "opening" and "closing" intermediate states are not shown.

=== Sequencers ===
Sequencers (also called generators) are a subclass of acceptors and transducers that have a single-letter input alphabet. They produce only one sequence, which can be seen as an output sequence of acceptor or transducer outputs.

=== Determinism ===
A further distinction is between deterministic (DFA) and non-deterministic (NFA, GNFA) automata. In a deterministic automaton, every state has exactly one transition for each possible input. In a non-deterministic automaton, an input can lead to one, more than one, or no transition for a given state. The powerset construction algorithm can transform any nondeterministic automaton into a (usually more complex) deterministic automaton with identical functionality.

A finite-state machine with only one state is called a "combinatorial FSM". It only allows actions upon transition into a state. This concept is useful in cases where a number of finite-state machines are required to work together, and when it is convenient to consider a purely combinatorial part as a form of FSM to suit the design tools.

== Alternative semantics ==
There are other sets of semantics available to represent state machines. For example, there are tools for modeling and designing logic for embedded controllers. They combine hierarchical state machines (which usually have more than one current state), flow graphs, and truth tables into one language, resulting in a different formalism and set of semantics. These charts, like Harel's original state machines, support hierarchically nested states, orthogonal regions, state actions, and transition actions.

== Mathematical model ==
In accordance with the general classification, the following formal definitions are found.

A deterministic finite-state machine or deterministic finite-state acceptor is a quintuple $(\Sigma, S, s_0, \delta, F)$, where:

- $\Sigma$ is the input alphabet (a finite non-empty set of symbols);
- $S$ is a finite non-empty set of states;
- $s_0$ is an initial state, an element of $S$;
- $\delta$ is the state-transition function: $\delta: S \times \Sigma \rightarrow S$ (in a nondeterministic finite automaton it would be $\delta: S \times \Sigma \rightarrow \mathcal{P}(S)$, i.e. $\delta$ would return a set of states);
- $F$ is the set of final states, a (possibly empty) subset of $S$.

For both deterministic and non-deterministic FSMs, it is conventional to allow $\delta$ to be a partial function, i.e. $\delta(s, x)$ does not have to be defined for every combination of $s \isin S$ and $x \isin \Sigma$. If an FSM $M$ is in a state $s$, the next symbol is $x$ and $\delta(s, x)$ is not defined, then $M$ can announce an error (i.e. reject the input). This is useful in definitions of general state machines, but less useful when transforming the machine. Some algorithms in their default form may require total functions.

A finite-state machine has the same computational power as a Turing machine that is restricted such that its head may only perform "read" operations, and always has to move from left to right. That is, each formal language accepted by a finite-state machine is accepted by such a kind of restricted Turing machine, and vice versa.

A finite-state transducer is a sextuple $(\Sigma, \Gamma, S, s_0, \delta, \omega)$, where:

- $\Sigma$ is the input alphabet (a finite non-empty set of symbols);
- $\Gamma$ is the output alphabet (a finite non-empty set of symbols);
- $S$ is a finite non-empty set of states;
- $s_0$ is the initial state, an element of $S$;
- $\delta$ is the state-transition function: $\delta: S \times \Sigma \rightarrow S$;
- $\omega$ is the output function.

If the output function depends on the state and input symbol ($\omega: S \times \Sigma \rightarrow \Gamma$) that definition corresponds to the Mealy model, and can be modelled as a Mealy machine. If the output function depends only on the state ($\omega: S \rightarrow \Gamma$) that definition corresponds to the Moore model, and can be modelled as a Moore machine. A finite-state machine with no output function at all is known as a semiautomaton or transition system.

If we disregard the first output symbol of a Moore machine, $\omega(s_0)$, then it can be readily converted to an output-equivalent Mealy machine by setting the output function of every Mealy transition (i.e. labeling every edge) with the output symbol given of the destination Moore state. The converse transformation is less straightforward because a Mealy machine state may have different output labels on its incoming transitions (edges). Every such state needs to be split in multiple Moore machine states, one for every incident output symbol.

== Optimization ==
Optimizing an FSM means finding a machine with the minimum number of states that performs the same function. The fastest known algorithm doing this is the Hopcroft minimization algorithm. Other techniques include using an implication table, or the Moore reduction procedure. Additionally, acyclic FSAs can be minimized in linear time.

== Implementation ==
=== Electronic ===
Fig. 9 The circuit diagram for a 4-bit TTL counter, a type of state machine

When implemented as a digital circuit, a finite-state machine (FSM) may be built using logic gates and flip flops, a programmable logic controller, or relays. Every such FSM requires a register to store the current state, combinational logic that determines the next state, and in many cases, combinational logic that converts the current state to FSM output signals.

Electronic FSMs are classified according to their general architecture. The output of a Mealy machine is a function of both its input signals and current state, whereas the output of a Moore machine is strictly a function of its current state. In a Medvedev machine, which is a subclass of Moore machines, the output logic is excluded and the state register is directly used as FSM output, thus minimizing the time delay between state transition and output change.

Through state encoding for low power state machines may be optimized to minimize power consumption.

=== Software applications ===
The following concepts are commonly used to build software applications with finite-state machines:

- Automata-based programming
- Event-driven finite-state machine
- Virtual finite-state machine
- State design pattern

=== Finite-state machines and compilers ===
Finite automata are often used in the frontend of programming language compilers. Such a frontend may comprise several finite-state machines that implement a lexical analyzer and a parser. Starting from a sequence of characters, the lexical analyzer builds a sequence of language tokens (such as reserved words, literals, and identifiers) from which the parser builds a syntax tree. The lexical analyzer and the parser handle the regular and context-free parts of the programming language's grammar.

== See also ==
- Abstract state machines
- Alternating finite automaton
- Communicating finite-state machine
- Control system
- Control table
- Decision tables
- DEVS
- Hidden Markov model
- Petri net
- Pushdown automaton
- Quantum finite automaton
- SCXML
- Semiautomaton
- Semigroup action
- Sequential logic
- State diagram
- Synchronizing word
- Transformation semigroup
- Transition system
- Tree automaton
- Turing machine
- UML state machine

== Sources ==
- Aho, Alfred V.; Sethi, Ravi; Ullman, Jeffrey D. (1986). Compilers: Principles, Techniques, and Tools (1st ed.). Addison-Wesley. ISBN 978-0-201-10088-4.
- Almeida, Marco; Moreira, Nelma; Reis, Rogerio (2007). On the performance of automata minimization algorithms (PDF) (Technical Report). Vol. DCC-2007-03. Porto Univ. Archived from the original (PDF) on 17 January 2009.
- Alur, R.; Kanade, A.; Ramesh, S.; Shashidhar, K. C. (2008). "Symbolic analysis for improving simulation coverage of Simulink/Stateflow models. International Conference on Embedded Software (pp. 89–98). Atlanta, GA: ACM" (PDF). Archived from the original (PDF) on 15 July 2011.
- Anderson, James Andrew; Head, Thomas J. (2006). Automata theory with modern applications. Cambridge University Press. ISBN 978-0-521-84887-9.
- Belzer, Jack; Holzman, Albert George; Kent, Allen (1975). Encyclopedia of Computer Science and Technology. Vol. 25. USA: CRC Press. ISBN 978-0-8247-2275-3.
- Black, Paul E (12 May 2008). "Finite State Machine". Dictionary of Algorithms and Data Structures. U.S. National Institute of Standards and Technology. Archived from the original on 13 October 2018.
- "Finite State Machines – Brilliant Math & Science Wiki". brilliant.org.
- Brutscheck, M.; Berger, S.; Franke, M.; Schwarzbacher, A.; Becker, S. (2008). Proceedings of the IET Irish Signals and Systems Conference (ISSC 2008) 18–19 June 2008. Structural Division Procedure for Efficient IC Analysis. Galway, Ireland. pp. 18–23.
- Felkin, M. (2007). "Comparing Classification Results between N-ary and Binary Problems". In Guillet, Fabrice; Hamilton, Howard J. (eds.). Quality Measures in Data Mining - Studies in Computational Intelligence. Vol. 43. Springer, Berlin, Heidelberg. pp. 277–301. doi:10.1007/978-3-540-44918-8_12. ISBN 978-3-540-44911-9.
- Hamon, G. (2005). A Denotational Semantics for Stateflow. International Conference on Embedded Software. Jersey City, NJ: ACM. pp. 164–172.
- Harel, D. (1987). "A Visual Formalism for Complex Systems. Science of Computer Programming, 231–274" (PDF). Archived from the original (PDF) on 15 July 2011.
- Hopcroft, John (1971). "An n log n algorithm for minimizing states in a finite automaton". Theory of Machines and Computations. Elsevier: 189–196. doi:10.1016/b978-0-12-417750-5.50022-1.
- Hopcroft, John E.; Ullman, Jeffrey D. (1979). Introduction to Automata Theory, Languages, and Computation (1st ed.). Addison-Wesley. ISBN 0-201-02988-X. (accessible to patrons with print disabilities)
- Hopcroft, John E.; Motwani, Rajeev; Ullman, Jeffrey D. (2006) [1979]. Introduction to Automata Theory, Languages, and Computation (3rd ed.). Addison-Wesley. ISBN 0-321-45536-3.
- Jonczy, Jacek (June 2008). "Algebraic path problems" (PDF). Archived from the original (PDF) on 21 August 2014.
- Kaeslin, Hubert (2008). "Mealy, Moore, Medvedev-type and combinatorial output bits". Digital Integrated Circuit Design: From VLSI Architectures to CMOS Fabrication. Cambridge University Press. p. 787. ISBN 978-0-521-88267-5.
- Keller, Robert M. (2001). "Classifiers, Acceptors, Transducers, and Sequencers" (PDF). Computer Science: Abstraction to Implementation (PDF). Harvey Mudd College. p. 480.
- Koshy, Thomas (2004). Discrete Mathematics With Applications. Academic Press. p. 762. ISBN 978-0-12-421180-3.
- Moore, Edward F. (1956). C.E. Shannon and J. McCarthy (ed.). "Gedanken-Experiments on Sequential Machines". Annals of Mathematics Studies. 34. Princeton University Press: 129–153.
- Pouly, Marc; Kohlas, Jürg (2011). Generic Inference: A Unifying Theory for Automated Reasoning. John Wiley & Sons. ISBN 978-1-118-01086-0.
- Revuz, D. (1992). "Minimization of Acyclic automata in Linear Time". Theoretical Computer Science. 92: 181–189. doi:10.1016/0304-3975(92)90142-3.
- Schwarz, B. "Synchronous Finite State Machines; Design and Behaviour" (PDF). University of Applied Sciences Hamburg. p. 18. Archived from the original (PDF) on 18 January 2017.
- Tiwari, A. (2002). "Formal Semantics and Analysis Methods for Simulink Stateflow Models" (PDF). sri.com.
- Wang, Jiacun (2019). Formal Methods in Computer Science. CRC Press. ISBN 978-1-4987-7532-8.
- Wright, David R. (2005). "Finite State Machines" (PDF). CSC215 Class Notes. David R. Wright website, N. Carolina State Univ. Archived from the original (PDF) on 27 March 2014.
