= State diagram =

Diagram of behavior of finite state systems

A state diagram for a door that can only be opened and closed

A state diagram is used in computer science and related fields to describe the behavior of systems. State diagrams require that the system is composed of a finite number of states. Sometimes, this is indeed the case, while at other times this is a reasonable abstraction. Many forms of state diagrams exist, which differ slightly and have different semantics.

== Overview ==
State diagrams provide an abstract description of a system's behavior. This behavior is analyzed and represented by a series of events that can occur in one or more possible states. Hereby "each diagram usually represents objects of a single class and track the different states of its objects through the system".

State diagrams can be used to graphically represent finite-state machines (also called finite automata). This was introduced by Claude Shannon and Warren Weaver in their 1949 book The Mathematical Theory of Communication. Another source is Taylor Booth in his 1967 book Sequential Machines and Automata Theory. Another possible representation is the state-transition table.

== Directed graph ==
A directed graph

A classic form of state diagram for a finite automaton (FA) is a directed graph with the following elements (Q, Σ, Z, δ, q_{0}, F):

- Vertices Q: a finite set of states, normally represented by circles and labeled with unique designator symbols or words written inside them
- Input symbols Σ: a finite collection of input symbols or designators
- Output symbols Z: a finite collection of output symbols or designators

The output function ω represents the mapping of ordered pairs of input symbols and states onto output symbols, denoted mathematically as ω : Σ × Q→ Z.

- Edges δ: represent transitions from one state to another as caused by the input (identified by their symbols drawn on the edges). An edge is usually drawn as an arrow directed from the present state to the next state. This mapping describes the state transition caused by an input. This is written mathematically as δ : Q × Σ → Q, so δ (the transition function) in the definition of the FA is given by both the pair of vertices connected by an edge and the symbol on an edge in a diagram representing this FA. Item δ(q, a) = p in the definition of the FA means that from the state named q under input symbol a, the transition to the state p occurs in this machine. In the diagram representing this FA, this is represented by an edge labeled by a pointing from the vertex labeled by q to the vertex labeled by p.
- Start state q_{0}: (not shown in the examples below). The start state q_{0} ∈ Q is usually represented by an arrow with no origin pointing to the state. In older texts, the start state is not shown and must be inferred from the text.
- Accepting state(s) F: If used, for example for accepting automata, F ∈ Q is the accepting state. It is usually drawn as a double circle. Sometimes the accept state(s) function as "Final" (halt, trapped) states.

For a deterministic finite automaton (DFA), nondeterministic finite automaton (NFA), generalized nondeterministic finite automaton (GNFA), or Moore machine, the input is denoted on each edge. For a Mealy machine, input and output are signified on each edge, separated with a slash "/": "1/0" denotes the state change upon encountering the symbol "1" causing the symbol "0" to be output. For a Moore machine the state's output is usually written inside the state's circle, also separated from the state's designator with a slash "/". There are also variants that combine these two notations.

For example, if a state has a number of outputs (e.g. "a= motor counter-clockwise=1, b= caution light inactive=0") the diagram should reflect this : e.g. "q5/1,0" designates state q5 with outputs a=1, b=0. This designator will be written inside the state's circle.

=== Example: DFA, NFA, GNFA, or Moore machine ===
S_{1} and S_{2} are states and S_{1} is an accepting state or a final state. Each edge is labeled with the input. This example shows an acceptor for binary numbers that contain an even number of zeros.

=== Example: Mealy machine ===
S_{0}, S_{1}, and S_{2} are states. Each edge is labeled with "j / k" where j is the input and k is the output.

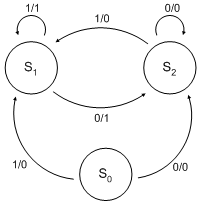

== Harel statechart ==
Diagram showing how Harel's Statecharts contributed to object-oriented methods and notation

Harel statecharts, invented by computer scientist David Harel, are gaining widespread usage since a variant has become part of the Unified Modeling Language (UML). The diagram type allows the modeling of superstates, orthogonal regions, and activities as part of a state.

Classic state diagrams require the creation of distinct nodes for every valid combination of parameters that define the state. For all but the simplest of systems, this can lead to a very large number of nodes and transitions between nodes (state and transition explosion), which reduces the readability of the state diagram. With Harel statecharts it is possible to model multiple cross-functional state diagrams within the statechart. Each of these cross-functional state machines can transition internally without affecting the other state machines. The current state of each cross-functional state machine defines the state of the system. The Harel statechart is equivalent to a state diagram but improves its readability.

== Alternative semantics ==
There are other sets of semantics available to represent state diagrams. For example, there are tools for modeling and designing logic for embedded controllers. These diagrams, like Harel's original state machines, support hierarchically nested states, orthogonal regions, state actions, and transition actions.

== State diagrams versus flowcharts ==
Newcomers to the state machine formalism often confuse state diagrams with flowcharts. The figure below shows a comparison of a state diagram with a flowchart. A state machine (panel (a)) performs actions in response to explicit events. In contrast, the flowchart (panel (b)) automatically transitions from node to node upon completion of activities.

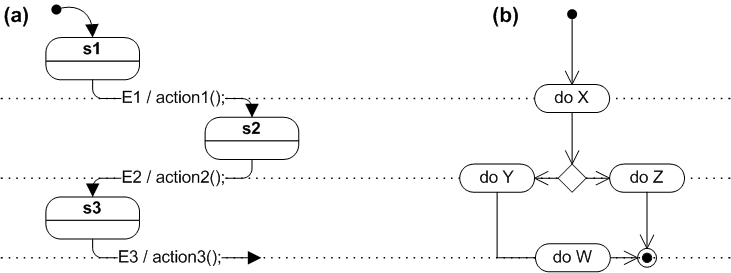

Nodes of flowcharts are edges in the induced graph of states. The reason is that each node in a flowchart represents a program command. A program command is an action to be executed. A command is not a state, but when applied to the program's state, causes a transition to another state.

In more detail, the source code listing represents a program graph. Executing the program graph (parsing and interpreting) results in a state graph. So each program graph induces a state graph. Conversion of the program graph to its associated state graph is called "unfolding" of the program graph.

The program graph is a sequence of commands. If no variables exist, then the state consists only of the program counter, which keeps track of program location during execution (what is the next command to be applied).

Before executing a command, the program counter is at some position (state before the command is executed). Executing the command moves the program counter to the next command. Since the program counter is the whole state, executing the command changed the state. Thus, the command itself corresponds to a transition between the two states.

Now consider the full case, when variables exist and are affected by the program commands being executed. Not only does the program counter change between different program counter locations, but variables might also change values due to the commands executed. Consequently, even if we revisit some program command (e.g. in a loop), this does not imply the program is in the same state.

In the previous case, the program would be in the same state because the whole state is just the program counter. Thus, if the program counterpoints to the same position (next command) it suffices to specify that we are in the same state. However, if the state includes variables that change value, we can be at the same program location with different variable values, meaning in a different state in the program's state space. The term "unfolding" originates from this multiplication of locations when producing the state graph from the program graph.

A self transition is a transition where the initial and the final state are the same.

A representative example is a do loop incrementing some counter until it overflows and becomes 0 again. Although the do loop executes the same increment command iteratively, its state space is not a cycle but a line. This results from the state being the program location (here cycling) combined with the counter value, which is strictly increasing (until the overflow). Thus, different states are visited in sequence until the overflow occurs. After the overflow the counter becomes 0 again, so the initial state is revisited in the state space, closing a cycle in the state space (assuming the counter was initialized to 0).

The figure above attempts to show that reversal of roles by aligning the arcs of the state diagrams with the processing stages of the flowchart.

One can compare a flowchart to an assembly line in manufacturing because the flowchart describes the progression of some task from beginning to end (e.g., transforming source code input into object code output by a compiler). A state machine generally has no notion of such a progression. The door state machine example shown above is not in a more advanced stage in the "closed" state than in the "opened" state. Rather, it simply reacts differently to the open/close events. A state in a state machine is an efficient way of specifying a behavior, rather than a stage of processing.

== Other extensions ==
An interesting extension is to allow arcs to flow from any number of states to any number of states. This only makes sense if the system is allowed to be in multiple states at once, which implies that an individual state only describes a condition or other partial aspect of the overall, global state. The resulting formalism is known as a Petri net.

Another extension allows the integration of flowcharts within Harel statecharts. This extension supports the development of software that is both event driven and workflow driven.

== See also ==
- David Harel
- DRAKON
- SCXML an XML language that provides a generic state-machine based execution environment based on Harel statecharts.
- UML state machine
- YAKINDU Statechart Tools is a software for modeling state diagrams (Harel statecharts, Mealy machines, Moore machines), simulation, and source code generation.
