= Mealy machine =

Machine whose output is determined by its state and inputs

In the theory of computation, a Mealy machine is a finite-state machine whose output values are determined both by its current state and the current inputs. This is in contrast to a Moore machine, whose output values are determined solely by its current state. A Mealy machine is a deterministic finite-state transducer: for each state and input, at most one transition is possible.

== History ==
The Mealy machine is named after George H. Mealy, who presented the concept in a 1955 paper, "A Method for Synthesizing Sequential Circuits".

== Formal definition ==
A Mealy machine is a 6-tuple $(S, S_0, \Sigma, \Lambda, T, G)$ consisting of the following:

- a finite set of states $S$
- a start state (also called initial state) $S_0$ which is an element of $S$
- a finite set called the input alphabet $\Sigma$
- a finite set called the output alphabet $\Lambda$
- a transition function $T : S \times \Sigma \rightarrow S$ mapping pairs of a state and an input symbol to the corresponding next state.
- an output function $G : S \times \Sigma \rightarrow \Lambda^*$ mapping pairs of a state and an input symbol to the corresponding output symbol.

In some formulations, the transition and output functions are coalesced into a single function $T : S \times \Sigma \rightarrow S \times \Lambda^*$.

"Evolution across time" is realized in this abstraction by having the state machine consult the time-changing input symbol at discrete "timer ticks" $t_0, t_1, t_2, ...$ and react according to its internal configuration at those idealized instants, or else having the state machine wait for a next input symbol (as on a FIFO) and react whenever it arrives.

== Comparation of Mealy and Moore machines ==
1. Mealy machines tend to have fewer states:
  - Different outputs on arcs (n^{2}) rather than states (n).
2. When implemented as electronic circuits (rather than as mathematical abstractions or code):
  - Moore machines are safer to use than Mealy machines:
    - Outputs change at the clock edge (always one cycle later).
    - In Mealy machines, input change can cause output change as soon as logic is done — a big problem when two machines are interconnected – asynchronous feedback may occur if one isn't careful.
  - Mealy machines react faster to inputs:
    - React in the same cycle—they don't need to wait for the clock.
    - In Moore machines, more logic may be necessary to decode state into outputs—more gate delays after clock edge.

== Diagram ==
The state diagram for a Mealy machine associates an output value with each transition edge, in contrast to the state diagram for a Moore machine, which associates an output value with each state.

When the input and output alphabet are both Σ, one can also associate to a Mealy automata a Helix directed graph (S × Σ, (x, i) → (T(x, i), G(x, i))). This graph has as vertices the couples of state and letters, each node is of out-degree one, and the successor of (x, i) is the next state of the automata and the letter that the automata output when it is instate x and it reads letter i. This graph is a union of disjoint cycles if the automaton is bireversible.

== Examples ==
=== Simple ===
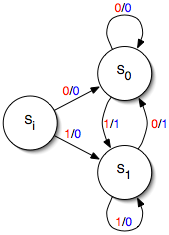
State diagram for a simple Mealy machine with one input and one output. (For every input value outputs 1 if the current input value is different from the previous or 0 otherwise.)

A simple Mealy machine has one input and one output. Each transition edge is labeled with the value of the input (shown in red) and the value of the output (shown in blue). The machine starts in state S_{i}. (In this example, the output is the exclusive-or of the two most-recent input values; thus, the machine implements an edge detector, outputting a 1 every time the input flips and a 0 otherwise.)

=== Complex ===
More complex Mealy machines can have multiple inputs as well as multiple outputs.

== Applications ==
Mealy machines provide a rudimentary mathematical model for cipher machines. Considering the input and output alphabet the Latin alphabet, for example, then a Mealy machine can be designed that given a string of letters (a sequence of inputs) can process it into a ciphered string (a sequence of outputs). However, although a Mealy model could be used to describe the Enigma, the state diagram would be too complex to provide feasible means of designing complex ciphering machines.

Moore/Mealy machines are DFAs that have also output at any tick of the clock. Modern CPUs, computers, cell phones, digital clocks and basic electronic devices/machines have some kind of finite state machine to control it.

Simple software systems, particularly ones that can be represented using regular expressions, can be modeled as finite state machines. There are many such simple systems, such as vending machines or basic electronics.

By finding the intersection of two finite state machines, one can design in a very simple manner concurrent systems that exchange messages for instance. For example, a traffic light is a system that consists of multiple subsystems, such as the different traffic lights, that work concurrently.

== See also ==
- Synchronous circuit
- Moore machine
- Algorithmic state machine
- Richards controller
