= Mircea Stan (professor) =

Romanian-American computer scientist

Mircea R. Stan is a Romanian-American computer scientist, researcher and professor of electrical and computer engineering at the University of Virginia (UVA). At the university he leads the High-Performance Low-Power (HPLP) lab, is an associate director of the Center for Automata Processing and is the Virginia Microelectronics Consortium (VMEC) chaired professor. His research is focused in the areas of high-performance low-power VLSI, temperature-aware circuits and architecture, embedded systems, cyber-physical systems, spintronics, and nanoelectronics.

== Education and career ==
Stan received his diploma in Electronics and Communications from Politehnica University of Bucharest, Romania in 1984. He later received his Master's Degree (1994) and Ph.D. (1996) from the University of Massachusetts – Amherst with Wayne Burleson as his dissertation advisor. In 1996, he joined the Charles L. Brown Department of Electrical and Computer Engineering at the University of Virginia, where he has been teaching and performing research since. During his time at UVA, Stan has become the Virginia Microelectronics Consortium (VMEC) Professor (2019), an associate director at the Center for Automata Processing (CAP), and the leader of the High-Performance Low-Power(HPLP) lab. In addition to his time at UVA, Stan has also worked at the University of California, Berkeley as a visiting faculty member (2004–2005). He was also a visiting faculty member at Intel (1999 and 2002) as well as IBM (2000).

== Research and publications ==
His research is focused on the areas of high-performance low-power VLSI, temperature-aware circuits and architecture, embedded systems, cyber-physical systems, spintronics, and nanoelectronics. He has a number of publications, including the Bus Invert low-power encoding method and the HotSpot thermal modeling framework.
