= Low-power electronics =

Electronics devices with low power consumption

Low-power electronics are electronics designed to consume less electrical power than usual, often at some expense. For example, notebook processors usually consume less power than their desktop counterparts, at the expense of computer performance.

== History ==
=== Watches ===
The earliest attempts to reduce the amount of power required by an electronic device were related to the development of the wristwatch. Electronic watches require electricity as a power source, and some mechanical movements and hybrid electromechanical movements also require electricity. Usually, the electricity is provided by a replaceable battery. The first use of electrical power in watches was as a substitute for the mainspring, to remove the need for winding. The first electrically powered watch, the Hamilton Electric 500, was released in 1957 by the Hamilton Watch Company of Lancaster, Pennsylvania.

The first quartz wristwatches were manufactured in 1967, using analog hands to display the time.

Watch batteries (strictly speaking cells, as a battery is composed of multiple cells) are specially designed for their purpose. They are very small and provide tiny amounts of power continuously for very long periods (several years or more). In some cases, replacing the battery requires a trip to a watch repair shop or watch dealer. Rechargeable batteries are used in some solar-powered watches.

The first digital electronic watch was a Pulsar LED prototype produced in 1970. Digital LED watches were very expensive and out of reach to the common consumer until 1975, when Texas Instruments started to mass-produce LED watches inside a plastic case.

Most watches with LED displays required that the user press a button to see the time displayed for a few seconds because LEDs used so much power that they could not be kept operating continuously. Watches with LED displays were popular for a few years, but soon the LED displays were superseded by liquid crystal displays (LCDs), which used less battery power and were much more convenient in use, with the display always visible and no need to push a button before seeing the time. Only in darkness, you had to press a button to light the display with a tiny light bulb, later illuminating LEDs.

Most electronic watches today use 32.768 KHz quartz oscillators.

As of 2013, processors specifically designed for wristwatches are the lowest-power processors manufactured today—often 4-bit, 32.768 kHz processors.

=== Mobile computing ===
When personal computers were first developed, power consumption was not an issue. With the development of portable computers however, the requirement to run a computer off a battery pack necessitated the search for a compromise between computing power and power consumption. Originally most processors ran both the core and I/O circuits at 5 volts, as in the Intel 8088 used by the first Compaq Portable. It was later reduced to 3.5, 3.3, and 2.5 volts to lower power consumption. For example, the Pentium P5 core voltage decreased from 5V in 1993, to 2.5V in 1997.

With lower voltage comes lower overall power consumption, making a system less expensive to run on any existing battery technology and able to function for longer. This is crucially important for portable or mobile systems. The emphasis on battery operation has driven many of the advances in lowering processor voltage because this has a significant effect on battery life. The second major benefit is that with less voltage and therefore less power consumption, there will be less heat produced. Processors that run cooler can be packed into systems more tightly and will last longer. The third major benefit is that a processor running cooler on less power can be made to run faster. Lowering the voltage has been one of the key factors in allowing the clock rate of processors to go higher and higher.

== Electronics ==
=== Computing elements ===
The density and speed of integrated-circuit computing elements has increased exponentially for several decades, following a trend described by Moore's Law. While it is generally accepted that this exponential improvement trend will end, it is unclear exactly how dense and fast integrated circuits will get by the time this point is reached. Working devices have been demonstrated which were fabricated with a MOSFET transistor channel length of 6.3 nanometres using conventional semiconductor materials, and devices have been built that use carbon nanotubes as MOSFET gates, giving a channel length of approximately one nanometre. The density and computing power of integrated circuits are limited primarily by power-dissipation concerns.

The overall power consumption of a new personal computer has been increasing at about 22% growth per year. This increase in consumption comes even though the energy consumed by a single CMOS logic gate in order to change its state has fallen exponentially in accordance with Moore's law, by virtue of shrinkage.

An integrated-circuit chip contains many capacitive loads, formed both intentionally (as with gate-to-channel capacitance) and unintentionally (between conductors which are near each other but not electrically connected). Changing the state of the circuit causes a change in the voltage across these parasitic capacitances, which involves a change in the amount of stored energy. As the capacitive loads are charged and discharged through resistive devices, an amount of energy comparable to that stored in the capacitor is dissipated as heat:

$$E_\mathrm{stored} = {1 \over 2} C U^2$$

The effect of heat dissipation on state change is to limit the amount of computation that may be performed within a given power budget. While device shrinkage can reduce some parasitic capacitances, the number of devices on an integrated circuit chip has increased more than enough to compensate for reduced capacitance in each individual device. Some circuits – dynamic logic, for example – require a minimum clock rate in order to function properly, wasting "dynamic power" even when they do not perform useful computations. Other circuits – most prominently, the RCA 1802, but also several later chips such as the WDC 65C02, the Intel 80C85, the Freescale 68HC11 and some other CMOS chips – use "fully static logic" that has no minimum clock rate, but can "stop the clock" and hold their state indefinitely. When the clock is stopped, such circuits use no dynamic power but they still have a small, static power consumption caused by leakage current.

As circuit dimensions shrink, subthreshold leakage current becomes more prominent. This leakage current results in power consumption, even when no switching is taking place (static power consumption). In modern chips, this current generally accounts for half the power consumed by the IC.

==== Low-power flip-flops ====
Low power flip-flops are flip-flops that are designed for low-power electronics, such as smartphones and notebooks. A flip-flop, or latch, is a circuit that has two stable states and can be used to store state information.

=== Reducing power loss ===
Loss from subthreshold leakage can be reduced by raising the threshold voltage and lowering the supply voltage. Both these changes slow down the circuit significantly. To address this issue, some modern low-power circuits use dual supply voltages to improve speed on critical paths of the circuit and lower power consumption on non-critical paths. Some circuits even use different transistors (with different threshold voltages) in different parts of the circuit, in an attempt to further reduce power consumption without significant performance loss.

Another method that is used to reduce power consumption is power gating: the use of sleep transistors to disable entire blocks when not in use. Systems that are dormant for long periods of time and "wake up" to perform a periodic activity are often in an isolated location monitoring an activity. These systems are generally battery- or solar-powered and hence, reducing power consumption is a key design issue for these systems. By shutting down a functional but leaky block until it is used, leakage current can be reduced significantly. For some embedded systems that only function for short periods at a time, this can dramatically reduce power consumption.

Two other approaches also exist to lower the power overhead of state changes. One is to reduce the operating voltage of the circuit, as in a dual-voltage CPU, or to reduce the voltage change involved in a state change (making a state change only, changing node voltage by a fraction of the supply voltage—low voltage differential signaling, for example). This approach is limited by thermal noise within the circuit. There is a characteristic voltage (proportional to the device temperature and to the Boltzmann constant), which the state switching voltage must exceed in order for the circuit to be resistant to noise. This is typically on the order of 50–100 mV, for devices rated to 100 degrees Celsius external temperature (about 4 kT, where T is the device's internal temperature in Kelvins and k is the Boltzmann constant).

The second approach is to attempt to provide charge to the capacitive loads through paths that are not primarily resistive. This is the principle behind adiabatic circuits. The charge is supplied either from a variable-voltage inductive power supply or by other elements in a reversible-logic circuit. In both cases, the charge transfer must be primarily regulated by the non-resistive load. As a practical rule of thumb, this means the change rate of a signal must be slower than that dictated by the RC time constant of the circuit being driven. In other words, the price of reduced power consumption per unit computation is a reduced absolute speed of computation. In practice, although adiabatic circuits have been built, it has been difficult for them to reduce computation power substantially in practical circuits.

Finally, there are several techniques for reducing the number of state changes associated with a given computation. For clocked-logic circuits, the clock gating technique is used, to avoid changing the state of functional blocks that are not required for a given operation. As a more extreme alternative, the asynchronous logic approach implements circuits in such a way that a specific externally supplied clock is not required. While both of these techniques are used to different extents in integrated circuit design, the limit of practical applicability for each appears to have been reached.

==== Data organization ====
Power consumption in relation to physical size of electronic hardware has increased as the components have become smaller and more densely packed. Coupled with high operating frequencies, this has led to unacceptable levels of power dissipation. Memory accounts for a high proportion of the power consumed, and this contribution may be reduced by optimizing data organization – the way data is stored.

==== State encoding ====
State encoding assigns a unique pattern of ones and zeros to each defined state of a finite-state machine (FSM). Traditionally, design criteria for FSM synthesis were speed, area, or both. Following Moore's law, with technology advancement, density and speed of integrated circuits have increased exponentially. With this, power dissipation per area has inevitably increased, which has forced designers for portable computing devices and high-speed processors to consider power dissipation as a critical parameter during design consideration.

=== Wireless communication elements ===
There are a variety of techniques for reducing the amount of battery power required for a desired wireless communication goodput. Some wireless mesh networks use "smart" low power broadcasting techniques that reduce the battery power required to transmit. This can be achieved by using power aware protocols and joint power control systems.

==== Low-power wide-area networks ====
A low-power, wide-area network (LPWAN or LPWA network) is a type of wireless telecommunication wide area network designed to allow long-range communication at a low bit rate between IoT devices, such as sensors operated on a battery.

Low power, low bit rate, and intended use distinguish this type of network from a wireless WAN that is designed to connect users or businesses, and carry more data, using more power. The LPWAN data rate ranges from 0.3 kbit/s to 50 kbit/s per channel.

A LPWAN may be used to create a private wireless sensor network, but may also be a service or infrastructure offered by a third party, allowing the owners of sensors to deploy them in the field without investing in gateway technology.

=== Costs ===
In 2007, about 10% of the average IT budget was spent on energy, and energy costs for IT were expected to rise to 50% by 2010.

The weight and cost of power supply and cooling systems generally depends on the maximum possible power that could be used at any one time. There are two ways to prevent a system from being permanently damaged by excessive heat. Most desktop computers design power and cooling systems around the worst-case CPU power dissipation at the maximum frequency, maximum workload, and worst-case environment. To reduce weight and cost, many laptop computers choose to use a much lighter, lower-cost cooling system designed around a much lower Thermal Design Power, that is somewhat above expected maximum frequency, typical workload, and typical environment. Typically such systems reduce (throttle) the clock rate when the CPU die temperature gets too hot, reducing the power dissipated to a level that the cooling system can handle.

=== Implantable medical devices ===
Implantable medical devices represent one of the most demanding applications of low-power electronics, as they must operate reliably for years or decades inside the human body without requiring battery replacement surgery. Cardiac pacemakers, cochlear implants, neurostimulators, and implantable cardioverter-defibrillators are among the devices that depend critically on ultra-low power circuit design.

Pacemakers, for example, consume only a few tens of microamperes of current, allowing lithium-iodide batteries to power the device for up to ten years or more without replacement. Design strategies include operating CMOS transistors in the weak inversion region to minimize current consumption, aggressive voltage scaling, power gating to shut down inactive circuit blocks, and the use of energy harvesting techniques such as converting mechanical energy from heartbeats or body motion into electrical power.

The tight power budget of implantable devices imposes stringent constraints on every subsystem, including signal acquisition front-ends, digital signal processors, and wireless telemetry links. As a result, implantable medical devices have driven significant innovation in ultra-low power integrated circuit design, and techniques developed for this field have had broad influence on low-power electronics in general.

=== Examples ===
- Transmeta
- Acorn RISC Machine (ARM)
- AMULET microprocessor
- Microchip nanoWatt XLP PIC microcontrollers
- Texas Instruments MSP430 microcontrollers
- Energy Micro/Silicon Labs EFM32 microcontrollers
- STMicroelectronics STM32 microcontrollers
- Atmel/Microchip SAM L microcontrollers

== See also ==
- Processor power dissipation
- Common Power Format
- Data organization for low power
- IT energy management
- Performance per watt
- Power management
- Green computing
- Dynamic frequency scaling
- Overclocking
- Underclocking
- Dynamic voltage scaling
- Operand isolation
- Glitch removal
- Autonomous peripheral operation
