= PowerTOP =

Software utility to display computer power consumption

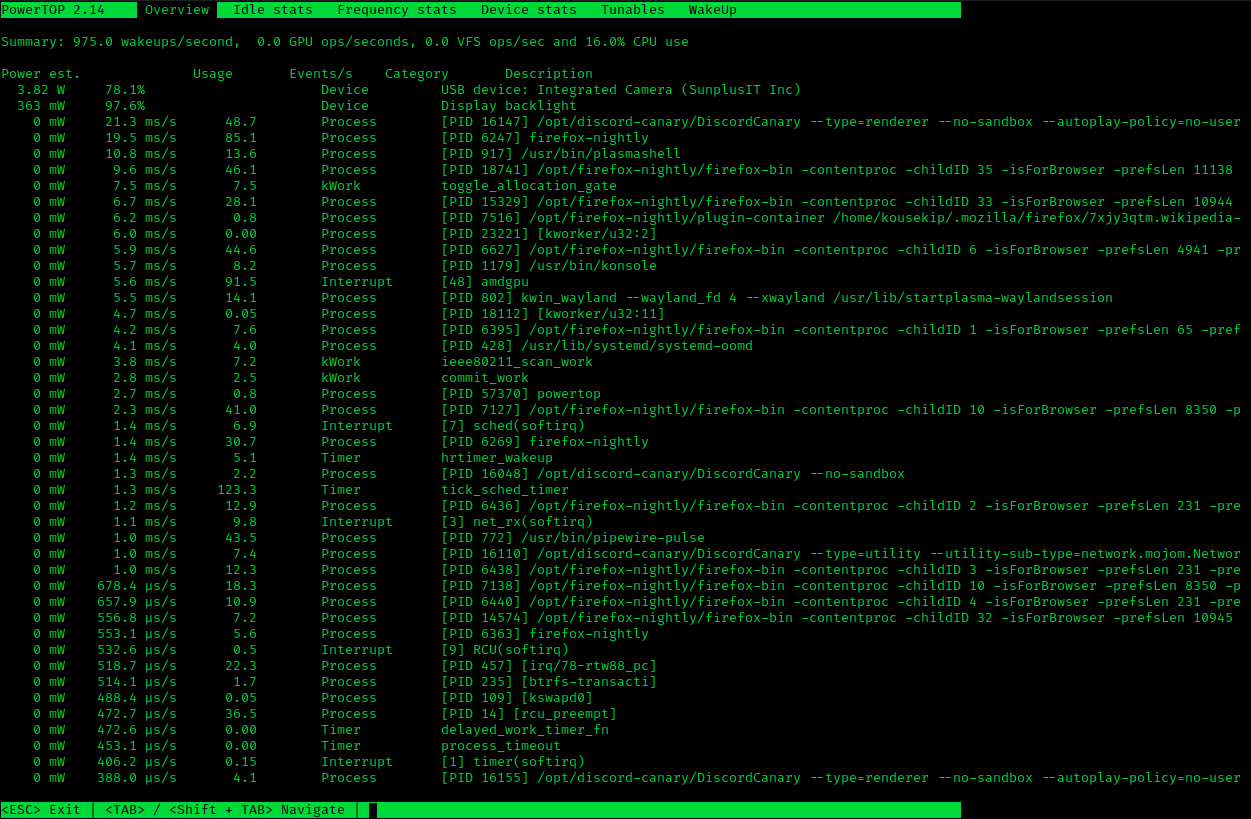
- Original author: Intel
- Release: 2007
- Stable release: 2.16.1 / October 7, 2026; 18 days ago
- Written in: C
- Operating system: Linux, Solaris
- Platform: x86, ARM, UltraSPARC
- Type: Utility
- License: GPLv2
- Website: 01.org/powertop/
- Repository: github.com/fenrus75/powertop

PowerTOP is a software utility designed to measure, explain and minimise a computer's electrical power consumption. It was released by Intel in 2007 under the GPLv2 license. It works for Intel, AMD, ARM and UltraSPARC processors.

PowerTOP analyzes the programs, device drivers, and kernel options running on a computer based on the Linux and Solaris operating systems, and estimates the power consumption resulting from their use. This information may be used to pinpoint software that results in excessive power use. This is particularly useful for laptop computer users who wish to prolong battery life, and data center operators, for whom electrical and cooling costs are a major expenditure.

== Usage ==
The original focus was on CPU sleep states, and showing the programs or drivers responsible for "wakeups" which prevent CPUs entering sleep states. A database of known problems automatically provides more user friendly "tips" for specific sources of wakeups. However, it also shows information on CPU frequency scaling. Over time the database has been expanded to include tips on a wide range of power consumption issues.

== Project activity ==
The latest release of PowerTOP (version 2.16.1) was made public on October 7, 2026. The project is hosted on GitHub.

== See also ==
- Power management
- Green computing
- LatencyTOP
- top (software)
- Run-time estimation of system and sub-system level power consumption
