= LatencyTOP =

Linux application

- Original author(s): Intel
- Developer(s): Arjan van de Ven
- Initial release: 2008
- Stable release: 0.5
- Repository: git.infradead.org/latencytop.git
- Written in: C
- Operating system: Linux, Solaris
- Platform: x86, ARM
- Type: Utility
- License: GPLv2
- Website: http://www.latencytop.org/

LatencyTOP is a Linux application for identifying operating system latency within the kernel and find out the operations/actions which cause the latency. LatencyTOP is a tool for software developers to visualize system latencies. Based on these observations, the source code of the application or kernel can be modified to reduce latency. It was released by Intel in 2008 under the GPLv2 license. It works for Intel, AMD and ARM processors.

As of 2021, the project appears inactive with the last commit to the source code in October 2009.

== Kernel integration ==
Support for LatencyTOP first appeared in the Linux 2.6.25 kernel, which added the CONFIG_LATENCYTOP instrumentation and a /proc/latency_stats interface for the userspace client. Jonathan Corbet’s contemporaneous coverage of 2.6.25 highlighted LatencyTop support among the headline features of the release.

== Functionality ==
According to the project’s manual page, latencytop identifies where in the system latency is happening by sampling the kernel’s latency tracker and attributing delays to specific processes, system calls and stack traces. The curses interface presents a real‑time top‑style list of the worst‑offending code paths; a GTK+ front‑end is available as an optional package.

== Development and availability ==
Intel engineer Arjan van de Ven released LatencyTOP in early 2008; the last upstream version, 0.5, was tagged in September 2009 and introduced the new GUI.

Although upstream development stalled, distributions continue to ship the dormant codebase:

- Red Hat Enterprise Linux 6.3 split the package into ›latencytop‹and a non‑GTK ›latencytop‑tui‹ build and corrected several debugfs‑mount issues in 2012.
- Fedora 42/Rawhide still compiles version 0.5 (GUI and TUI flavours) as of 2025.
- Ubuntu 18.04 LTS provides 0.5‑ubuntu3 binaries for all architectures.
- Mageia Cauldron rebuilt the same source as `latencytop‑0.5‑11.mga10` in October 2024.

Modern generic kernels may omit CONFIG_LATENCYTOP, causing the utility to exit with “Please enable the CONFIG_LATENCYTOP configuration in your kernel”. This issue was reported against Ubuntu 4.4 kernels in 2016 and remains a common hurdle when using distribution kernels.

== See also ==
- Green computing
- PowerTOP
- top (software)
