= Constant Awake Mode =

- International standard: IEEE 802.11
- Developed by: IEEE

In the context of wireless networking, Constant Awake Mode (CAM) is a mode that is intended for devices when power is not an issue, such as when AC power is available to a device. This mode provides the best connectivity from the user perspective. CAM is also appropriate when a portable device will be used for only a short time that the battery can easily accommodate. This is the most commonly used mode, and can be contrasted with power saving modes, which may or may not be offered by a particular device.
