= Zenna =

Zenna is both a given name and a surname. Notable people with the name include:

== First name ==
- Zenna Henderson (1917-1983), American elementary school teacher and author
- Zenna Hopson (born 1965), British businesswoman

== Surname ==
- Kathryn Zenna (born 1971), Canadian film and television actress

== Others ==
- Helen Zenna Smith, a pseudonym used by Evadne Price
