= St John's College, Portsmouth =

Former independent school in Hampshire, England

St John's College

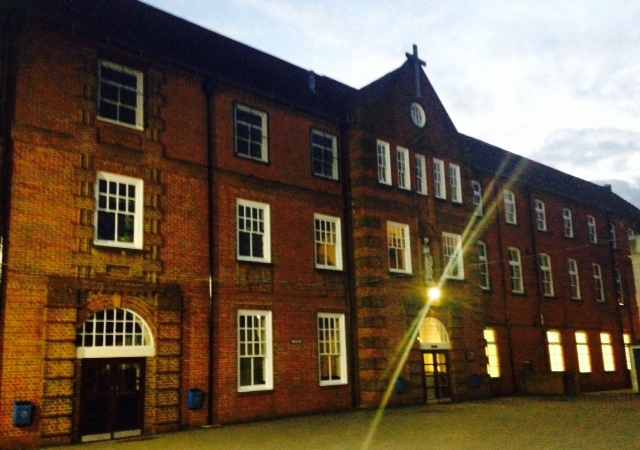
- St John's College – the Scholes building

Location
- Grove Road South; Southsea, Portsmouth, Hampshire, PO5 3QW; England; 50.7882°N 1.0858°W

Information
- Type: Private, private day and boarding
- Motto: Per Laborem Ad Honorem (Through work to honour)
- Religious affiliation: Roman Catholic
- Patron saint: St Jean-Baptiste de la Salle
- Established: 1908; 118 years ago
- Closed: 14 July 2022
- Chair of Governors: Zenna Hopson
- Head teacher: Mary Maguire
- Gender: Co-educational
- Age: 2 to 18
- Enrolment: 650 (2010) 577 (2017) 458 (2020) 250 (2022)
- Houses: Edwin Damian; Leo Alan
- Colours: Gold and Blue
- Former pupils: Old Johannians Association
- Affiliation: The Society of Heads, Independent Association of Preparatory Schools and La Sallian educational institutions
- Publications: St John's Gazette; Inform; The Termly Star

St John's College was a private day and boarding school located in Southsea, Hampshire, England. The De La Salle brothers founded it in 1908. In May 2022, the Governors announced that the school would not re-open for the academic year starting that September, citing declining student numbers, under-investment and the impact of the COVID-19 pandemic as the causes. In August 2022, St John's College appointed administrators and went into liquidation. The head of the college at the time of closure was Mary Maguire.

The college has several notable alumni, known as Old Johannians, including a former Lord Chief Justice of England and Wales, Lord Burnett of Maldon, England footballer Alex Oxlade-Chamberlain and BBC newsreader George Alagiah.

== History ==
St John's College was founded in Southsea, Portsmouth in 1908 by the De La Salle brothers as an independent boys' school. The founding headmaster was Brother Firme of Quiévy, France. The Catholic De La Salle brothers supported the ethos and ideals of Saint Jean-Baptiste de La Salle, the patron saint of teachers, and the founder of the Institute of the Brothers of the Christian Schools.

St John's moved to its second and final site in 1912. On 28 May 1912, Edmond Brunher, Superior General of the Order, countersigned the conveyance of Grove House (known today as the Castle) and Warleigh House. The college subsequently purchased other properties in its vicinity, settling the entire urban campus. There has been a school chapel on the site since 1913. St John's Gazette was founded in 1915.

During the First World War, 119 pupils and staff joined the Armed Forces. Twelve died in the war. Between 1928 and 1929 the WWI memorial and a statue of St John Baptist De La Salle were both unveiled in the college grounds.

An application to the College of Arms for the school crest was granted in the early 1930s. The five pointed star represents the Lasallian Order, the position of St John's by the sea is affirmed by the six waves.

Portsmouth was subjected to many enemy air-raids in the Second World War and the college suffered extensive damage. During the war the college established a sister school in Hassocks, Sussex, where boarders were evacuated away from the bombing in Southsea. Some 53 Johannians died in the war, including 1940–41 school captain and captain of cricket, Lieutenant Edward Fitzgerald.

The Roll of Honour of 1914–18 had a much lengthier list added to it, and a further memorial board to the Old Johannians who lost their lives is now maintained by the school. Every Remembrance Day the names on the memorial are read out by the staff and pupils.

Shortly after the war the college began to rebuild itself. In 1945, St John's College sixth form was founded. The school became a Catholic direct grant grammar school under the Education Act 1944 for many years while maintaining its independent status as a member of the Association of Governing Bodies of Public Schools. The site continued to advance from 1958 to 1968 with the opening of the Jubilee block on the college's 50th anniversary. A parent-teacher association was formed in 1962.

Following a trend set by many independent boys' schools, girls were admitted into the sixth form in 1971. The college did not become fully coeducational until 1996. In 2008, St John's celebrated its centenary. On 1 September 2015, the college attained full independent charitable status. In 2018, the college's sixth form was the highest value-added school in the Portsmouth area.

=== Closure ===
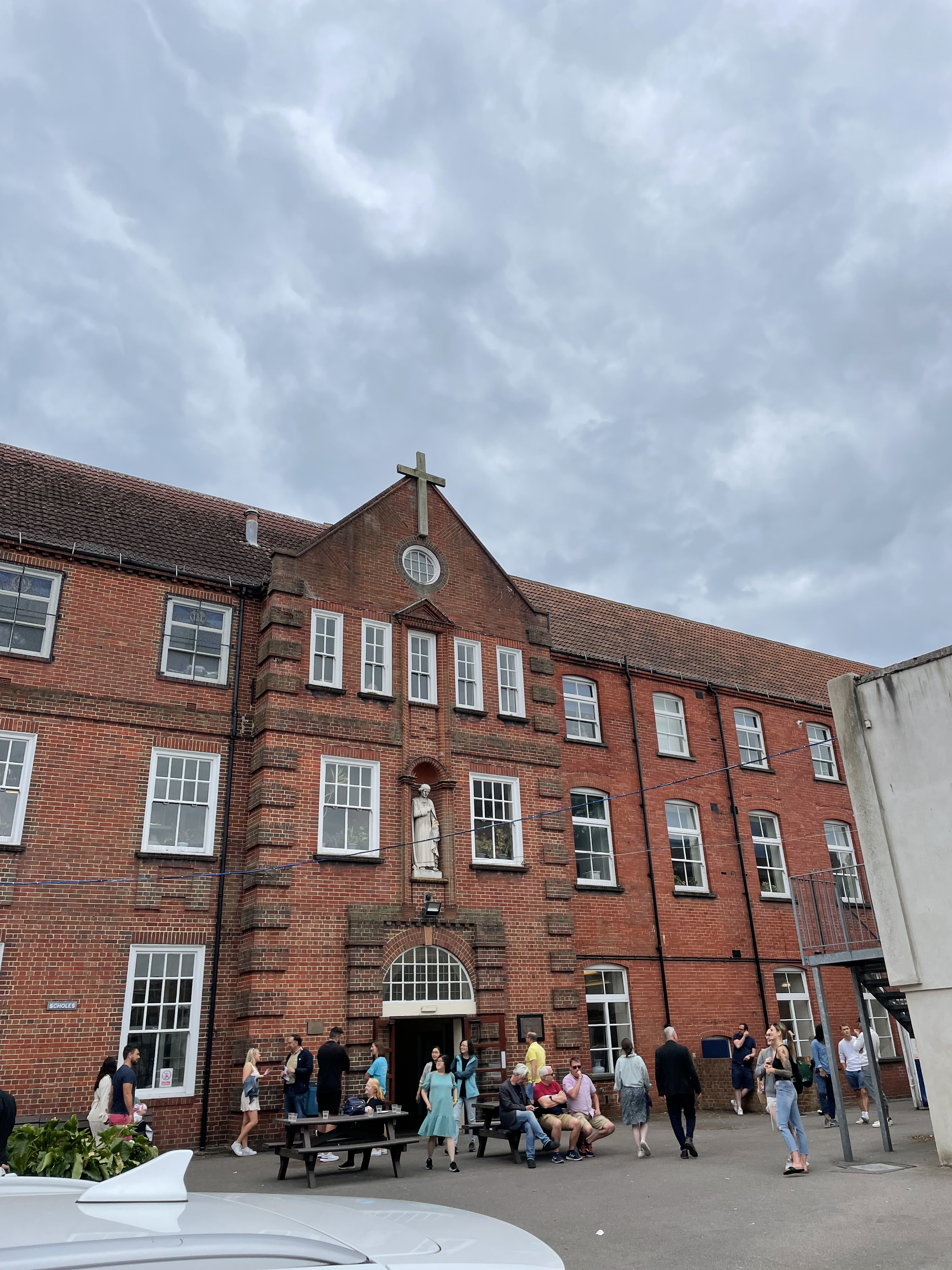
Ex-staff and alumni outside the Scholes Building, 3 July 2022

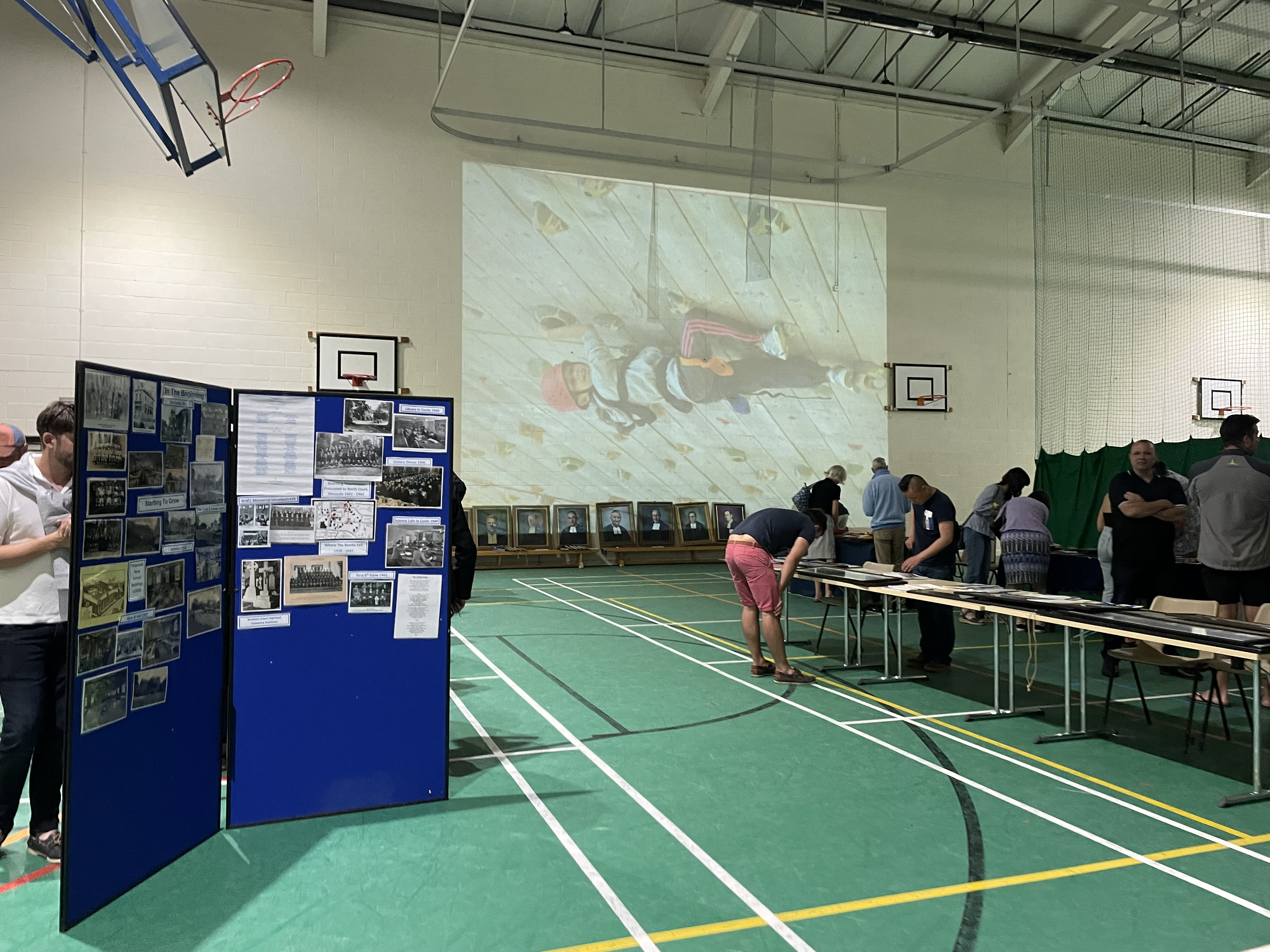
Memorabilia on display inside the Sports Hall, 3 July 2022

On 16 May 2022, the Governors of St John's College announced that the school would not re-open in September 2022 due to declining student numbers (from 630 pupils in 2010 to 256 pupils in 2022). Head of College, Mary Maguire, said: 'It is with great sadness that we have to announce the closure of St John's. We are all completely devastated but our governors simply had no choice. We do not have enough pupils to make the school viable.' She said:

It is heartbreaking. We all love this school, and this is the very last thing we would have wanted to happen.' Chair of Governors, Zenna Hopson, said: 'If not for the pandemic and if not for years of chronic under-investment from our landlords we would not be in this situation.' She added: 'We have genuinely done everything we could to try to keep St John’s going but we have reached a point where it is no longer practical. We did hope that the school would be bought, and investment provided for the site to be re-developed and then allowed to continue but this deal fell through. We are desperately sorry, and we are doing all we can to support our pupils, their families and our staff.

The school permanently closed on 14 July 2022 at the end of the summer term for the 2021–22 academic year.

== Academic performance ==
St John's College was an academically strong institution. In 2018, a pass rate of 77% A*-C at A-Level was achieved with multiple individual successes and this resulted in the College's Sixth Form in becoming the highest value-added in the Portsmouth area that year. Also in 2018, an A*-C pass rate of 82% was achieved for GCSE again with multiple individual successes. In 2019, the success continued with multiple 100% pass rates in A-Level subjects as well as a GCSE A*-C pass rate of 84.5%.

An investigation by the Independent Schools Inspectorate (ISI) carried out between the 25 and 26 January 2017 concluded that "the education the pupils receive, enables the school to fulfil its aims of offering a fully rounded educational experience in all aspects" as well as concluding that "The quality of pupils’ academic and other achievements is good" while "The quality of the pupils’ personal development is excellent". At this time, the College had a total of 577 students on roll according to the report.

== Structure ==
St John's was split into three principal sections: a lower school for children aged between 2 and 9 (reception to year 4); a middle school for pupils aged 9 to 13 (year 5 to year 8) and a senior school for students aged 13 to 18, which includes a sixth form for students studying for their A-Levels. Integral to St John's was a boarding school for students aged 9 to 18 from the UK and overseas.

St John's structured its years into a house system. In the senior school there were four houses: Leo, Edwin, Alan and Damian, all named after notable people who have served as head of college over the years. The college organised inter-house activities such as house 5-a-side matches, house music and house drama. Points were tallied and at the end of each academic year a trophy was awarded to the house with the highest score. Points could also be gained for good behaviour, uniform and manners. An annual speech night and prize giving ceremony took place each summer (with the final three taking place in autumn). A Founders Day service was held each November at St John's Cathedral, Portsmouth.

St John's College and its head-teachers were members of the Independent Schools Council, the Boarding Schools' Association, the Independent Association of Preparatory Schools and the Society of Heads. St John's College retained its Catholic traditions was an associate member of the Lasallian educational institutions and the De La Salle network of schools, which extends worldwide covering 81 countries from preschool through to universities.

Warleigh House and head teacher's study, front view, St. John's College, Southsea, Portsmouth

== Co-curricular activities ==
The lower, middle and senior Schools offered extra-curricular activities and after-school clubs. These included a debating club, orchestra clubs, a sailing club, history club, science club, design and tech club, gaming and astronomy GCSE clubs. Some of these clubs could date their history at the college back to the 1920s and 1930s.

Foreign language trips took place in Europe, and each year the college organised a ski-trip for students. The college also had a Duke of Edinburgh Award programme, organising an annual expedition for participating students.

=== The Politics Society ===
The Politics Society at St. John's was founded in 1977. The founder, Bernard Black (1934–2013), was head of political studies from 1977 to 1999. Speakers have included Margaret Thatcher, Harold Wilson (former prime minister and previous president of the society), Tony Benn, Jeffrey Archer, Enoch Powell, (was due to speak but was cancelled late on due to pressure from the schools Backers), Tariq Ali - was by comparison permitted to speak, Rowan Williams – former Archbishop of Canterbury, Douglas Hurd (current President of the Society), Nigel Farage, former Foreign Secretary Jack Straw, former Green Party leader – Caroline Lucas, Theresa May – Home Secretary and subsequently the UK's second woman prime minister; Lord Judge, former Lord Chief Justice; the former Director of Liberty, Shami Chakrabarti; the United States Ambassador to the UK, Matthew Barzun; and Lord Neuberger, former president of the Supreme Court. Meetings are coordinated by Graham Goodlad, head of government and politics at St John's College. On the 10th of June 2022, it was announced that the St John's Politics Society would be transferring to the nearby Portsmouth High School and rebranding itself as the "Portsmouth Politics Society" in light of St John's announcing its closure in May 2022. All meetings originally planned for the rest of 2022 are still scheduled to take place at the new site with their original dates and times.

=== The Chapel Choir ===
The St John's College chapel choir can date its roots back to the 1940s when the choir was said to be 50 strong and performed in local churches and Hampshire music festivals, under first the musical direction of John Deegan until 1948 and then Helen Dyer, who remained choir mistress for the next 25 years.

== Sport ==
=== History ===
Sporting endeavour has been a feature of life at St John's since its foundation. There has been an annual sports day at St John's College since 1918. For a comparatively small school it has produced a number of notable alumni (see Notable former pupils, below).

Over its history the college has promoted a wide range of sporting opportunities for its students. The diversity of its success has included 1913 Portsmouth Times Rifle Cup and Holbrook Rifle Cup champions; Hampshire Six-a-Side football finalists 1926, 1974, champions 1938, 1947, 1951, 1954, 1964; senior doubles tennis champions, Wimbledon Park Tournament 1951; Southsea Regatta Schools Invitational Rowing Champions 1951, 1952, 1956, 1959; Inter-Schools Cup rowing champions – 14 consecutive years 1953–67; Box Clement Shield for Swimming 1955–56; Portsmouth City Championship for swimming 1956; Serpentine Rowing Champions 1961; Hampshire Rugby Sevens Champions 1965; Public Schools Football Plate winners 1967; British Orienteering Championships winners 1972; under 14 and under 15 Portsmouth Football League Champions, 1976.

=== Recent sporting success ===
In more modern times, the school had a clean-sweep as champions of the under 13, under 14, under 15 and under 16 age-groups of the South East Hampshire Netball League in 2014. This was the fourth consecutive season SJC had won the under 15 league. Also in 2014, the under 18's lifted the Hampshire Rugby plate and in 2015, the under 15's won the rugby NatWest vase. In 2018, the college won the Society of Heads Bowl in rugby 7's. In 2017, the college came third in the senior boys indoor British Independent Schools Ski Championships and in 2018 won the Senior Southern Regional ski competition (u/16). Other notable sporting successes at county level include winning the Hampshire boys hockey tournaments in 2016 (u/13); 2017 (u/13); 2018 (u/13); 2019 (u/14); and 2020 (u/14), with the SJC girls winning the Hampshire County Championships in rounders in 2016 (u/15) and in hockey in 2017 (u/13). The Lower School was the Wessex Prep Schools league winners in rugby in 2016. In 2017, the school won the district tennis championships. In 2019, St John's under 15 boys won the Hampshire rugby 7's plate and later that year the College won the South East Hampshire Schools Cricket championship (u/15).

=== Sports facilities ===
Within the college grounds there was a multi-purpose hall for badminton, basketball, netball, volleyball and cricket nets, together with a squash court, fitness suite and a climbing wall. Outside there was an all-weather AstroTurf pitch originally completed in the 2012–13 academic year.

The school also owned some 40 acres (16 ha) of sports grounds at Farlington (known as "Fields"), which include netball and tennis courts, cricket, football and rugby pitches, as well as a pavilion. The school sometimes uses the HMS Temeraire grounds, and sports facilities offered by the University of Portsmouth.

Each school term focused on a different sport. The boys competed in rugby union, field hockey and cricket, whilst the girls play field hockey, netball and rounders.

Co-curricular sports clubs included badminton, basketball, climbing, dance, squash, swimming, sailing and skiing.

== Alumni ==
St John's ex-students formed the Old Johannians in 1919, first as an Old Boys' Club, then in 1925 as the Old Johannian Association. In 1927 St. John's Gazette published St John's first school song, which later provided a resonance at Old Johannian Annual Dinners:

After World War 2, on 12 January 1946, the association held a victory reunion dinner, attended by some 100 Old Johannians, the majority still in uniform.

Sir Alec Rose accepted honorary membership of the Old Johannian Association before his single-handed circumnavigation of the globe in 1967-8 and attended the OJ golden jubilee dinner and dance upon his return.

The association continues to run several gatherings each year, notably the AGM and dinner held on the first Saturday after Easter, and a golf tournament.

St John's College, front aspect 2016

== Notable former pupils ==
=== Arts and media ===
- George Alagiah, BBC newsreader
- Alastair Appleton, TV presenter
- Tomasz Schafernaker, BBC weather presenter
- Alfie Allen, actor
- Alec Utgoff, actor
- Guy Mankowski, author
- Anthony Minghella, film director (1954–2008). Oscar winner: The English Patient, Oscar nominee: The Talented Mr Ripley, The Reader
- Guillaume Gallienne, actor, screenwriter and film director. Winner of two Molière Awards and two César Awards (2014)
- Garrick Palmer English painter and wood engraver
- Andy Cunningham puppeteer, writer and ventriloquist, OJ 1961–68 [d. 2017]
- Christopher Logue, English poet [d. 2011]
- Mike Hugg founding member of the 1960s group Manfred Mann
- Colin Purbrook, internationally renowned jazz pianist, 'the Grand Vizier of parties', OJ 1948–54 [d. 1999]
- Erica Rutherford artist, filmmaker and writer
- Barry Perowne novelist, best known for continuing the A. J. Raffles series, OJ 1916 (d. 1990)

=== Professions ===
- Ian Burnett, Baron Burnett of Maldon, school captain 1975–6, called to the Bar in 1980, appointed to the High Court in 2008; promoted to the Court of Appeal in 2014; and from 2 October 2017, the Lord Chief Justice of England and Wales 2017–2023
- Cuthbert Johnson, Abbot of Quarr Abbey, d.2017
- Sean Hughes former MP, a British history teacher and Labour politician (d. 1990)
- Norman Cole, MP, entered Parliament in 1951 as Liberal and Conservative member for the South Division of Bedfordshire (d.1979)

=== Sport ===
- Alex Oxlade-Chamberlain, football player for Liverpool FC, England, and formerly Arsenal F.C. Third youngest player to represent England in a major tournament.
- Christian Oxlade-Chamberlain, midfield footballer for Notts County F.C.
- Lawrence Prittipaul, former Hampshire county cricketer and holder of the highest SJC 20-over batting total
- Darryl Powell former Premier League footballer, played international football for Jamaica, World Cup France 98, MD sports management company
- Matthew Scott (cricketer), former Hampshire Cricket Board county cricket player
- Steve Foster, football player for Portsmouth F.C., Brighton & Hove F.C., Aston Villa F.C., and England.
- Ron Newman, former association football player and coach. Member of the US National Soccer Hall of Fame
- Richard Utley, former Hampshire cricketer who made his first-class debut in 1927

=== Academia ===
- Timothy C. Lethbridge, professor of computer science and software engineering at the University of Ottawa.

=== Forces ===
- Michael Willcocks, former Black Rod. Chief of Staff for the Allied Command Europe Rapid Reaction Corps, Chief of Staff for the Land Component of the Peace Implementation Force. UK military representative to NATO and the European Union from 2000 to 2001.
- Anthony Cleland Welch, UK-based former soldier, UN official, politician and academic, Deputy Chief of Staff of the 3rd (UK) Armoured Division, Deputy Chief of Staff (Land) during the first Gulf War
- Ronald Gardner-Thorpe, Lord Mayor of London 1980, Aide-de-Camp to King Frederick of Denmark, was a British company director, Liberal Party politician. Chairman, Old Johannians, 1961, Founder of the Gardner-Thorpe Prize for French, Governor of St John's (1963)
- Jean E. François Demozay, Commandeur de la legion d'honneur, compagnon de la liberation (1915–1945), OJ −1931
- Lieutenant-Colonel Paddy Doyle

== SJC associates ==
- Neil Hamilton, between 1973 and 1976 a teacher at St John's College. Alleged 'cash for questions' MP, barrister, member of the Welsh Assembly and Deputy Chairman of the UK Independence Party (UKIP)
- Douglas Fairbanks Jr., visited and funded a balloon service hospital set up in SJC's Woodlands boarding house during WWII

=== In film ===
- The Swallows and Amazons re-adaptation, starring Rafe Spall, with leading roles played by Old Johannians Dane Hughes as John Walker and Seren Hawkes as Nancy Blackett.
- The award-winning French coming of age film Me, Myself and Mum by Old Johannian Guillaume Gallienne featured in its publicity a variant of the college crest and uniform.

=== Headmasters of St John's College ===
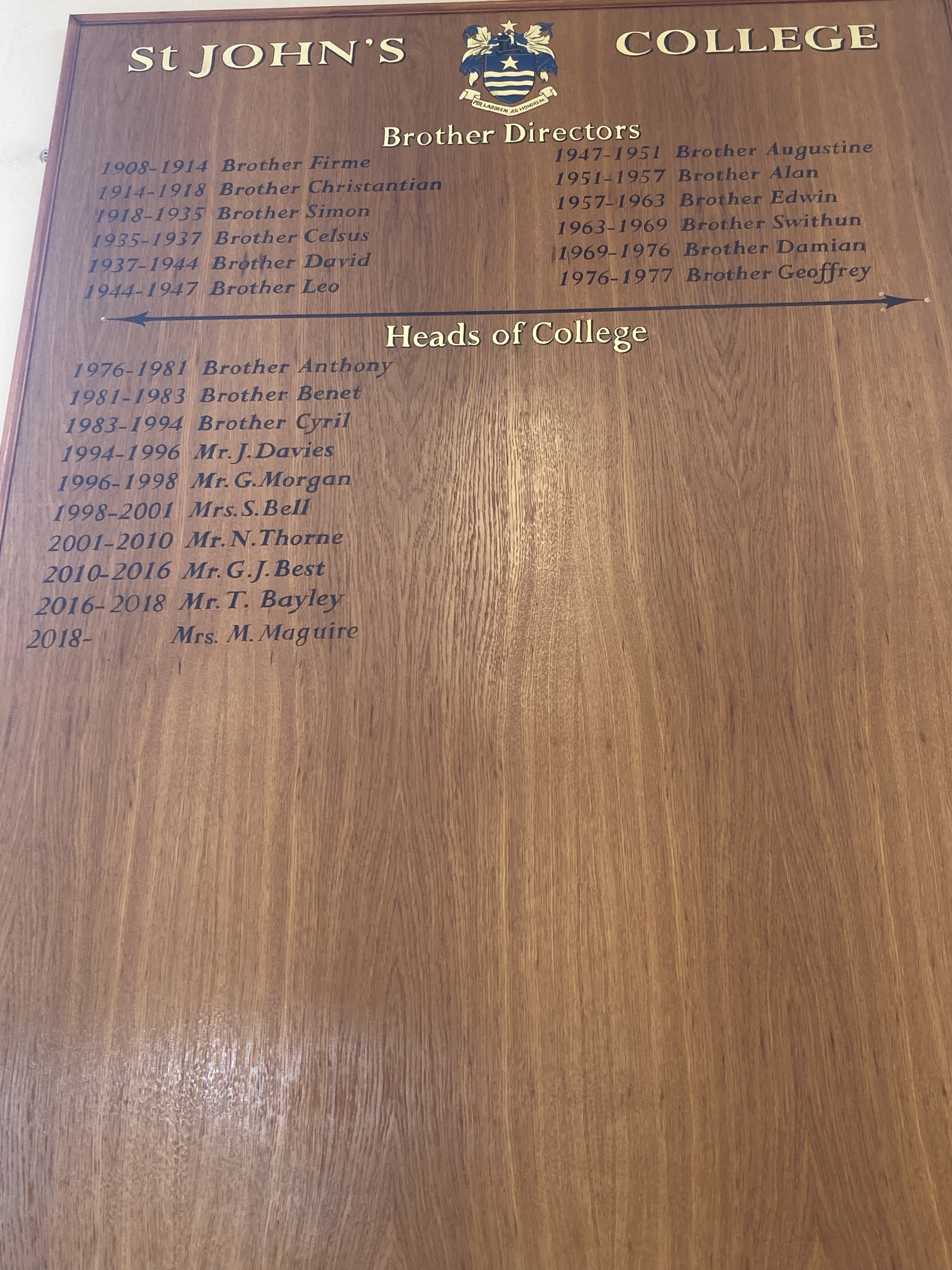
Board of Honour showcasing all the different Brother Directors and Heads of College of St John's College as situated in the dining hall

All the Heads of College and former Brother-Directors of St John's College include:

- Mary Maguire, 2019–2022, acting Head 2018–2019, final head teacher
- Tim Bayley, 2016-2018
- Graham Best, 2010–2016
- Nigel Thorne, 2001-2010
- S. Bell, 1998-2001
- G. Morgan, 1996-1998
- J. Davies, 1994-1996
- Cyril, 1983-1994
- Benet, 1981-1983
- Anthony, 1976-1981
- Geoffrey, 1976-1977
- Damian, 1969–1976
- Swithun, 1963-1969
- Edwin, 1957–1963
- Alan Maurice, 1951–1957
- Augustine, 1947-1951
- Leo Barrington, 1944–1947
- David, 1937-1944
- Celsus, 1935-1937
- Simon 1918–1935, longest serving headmaster
- Christantian 1914–1918, headmaster during the Great War
- Firme of Quievy, 1908–1914, founding headmaster
