= Anatoly Shalyto =

Russian computer scientist (born 1948)

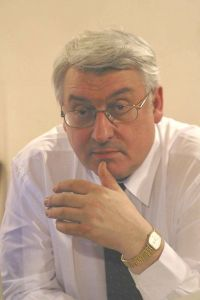
- Born: 28 May 1948 (age 78); Leningrad, USSR
- Education: SPb ETU "LETI"
- Known for: Technology of Automata-Based Programming named Switch-technology, Open Project Documentation Initiative, "Save the best in the universities of Russia"
- Awards: Russian State Government award in education, 2008
- Scientific career
- Fields: Computer science, software engineering
- Workplaces: ITMO University

Anatoly Abramovich Shalyto (Russian: Анато́лий Абра́мович Шалы́то, 28 May 1948 in Leningrad, Soviet Union) is a Russian scientist, doctor of sciences, and professor. He was awarded by Russian State Government in 2008 for his achievements in education and his development of the technology for Automata-based programming called "Switch-technology." He is also an initiator of the Open Project Documentation Initiative.

== Main achievements ==
- Introduced a Switch-technology for Automata-Based Programming. He is also a co-author of a UniMod tool that supports Automata-Based Programming.
- Initiator of the Foundation for Open Project Documentation.
- Author of a series of articles devoted to problems related to computer science and education in Russia.
- Provided scientific results in Boolean functions and Logic Control.
- Maintained an IEEE and IEEE Industrial Electronics Society Membership. He was also Chair of the IEEE Technical Committee on Industrial Informatics (2015).
- Presented as Workshop Organizer at the 1st IEEE International Workshop on Distributed Intelligent Automation Systems held in conjunction with IEEE ISPA in 2015 in Helsinki. He was also a member of the Reed-Muller Workshop in 2017.

== Papers ==
- 1. Artyukhov V. L., Kopeikin G. A., Shalyto A. A. Estimation of the Logical Efficiency of Integrated Microcircuitry //Automatic Control and Computer Sciences. 1981. Vol. 22. No 1, pp. 32–34.
- 2. Artyukhov V. L., Kopeikin G. A., Shalyto A. A. Bounds On The Realization Complexity Of Boolean Formulas By Tree Circuits Of Tunable Modules // Automation and Remote Control. 1981. Vol. 42. No 11. Part 2, pp. 1532–1537.
- 3. Artyukhov V. L., Shalyto A. A., Kuznetsova O. S. Evaluation of the Functional Capabilities of Programmable Logical Arrays // Automatic Control and Computer Sciences. 1985. Vol. 26. No 2, pp. 69–73.
- 4. Sagalovich Yu. L., Shalyto A. A. Binary programs and their realization by asynchronous automata // Problems of Information Transmission. 1987. Vol. 23, No 1, pp. 89–96.
- 5..Artyukhov V., Kondrat`ev V., Shalyto A. Generating Boolean Functions Via Arithmetic Polinomials //Automation and Remote Control. 1988. Vol. 49. No 4, pp. 508–515.
- 6. Kondrat`ev V. N., Shalyto A. A. Realization of Systems of Boolean Functions by Liner Arithmetic Polinomials //Automation and Remote Control. 1993. Vol. 54. No. 3, pp. 472–488.
- 7. Kondrat`ev V. N., Shalyto A. A. Realization of Boolean Functions by One Linear Arithmetic Polynomial with Masking //Automation and Remote Control. 1996. Vol. 57, No.1, pp. 127–137.
- 8. Kondrat`ev V. N., Shalyto A. A. Realizations of a system of Boolean functions by linear arithmetic polynomials //Automation and Remote Control. 1997. Vol. 58. No. 3, pp. 492–503.
- 9. Kuznetsov B., Shalyto A. Realization of Boolean Formulas by Linear Binary Grafs. I.Synthesize and Analysis // Journal of Computer and Systems Sciences International.1994. Vol. 33. No. 5.
- 10. Kuznetsov B., Shalyto A. Realization of Boolean Formulas by Linear Binary Grafs. II.Estimations of Number and Total Length of Paths // Journal of Computer and Systems Sciences International. 1995. Vol. 34, No. 3.
- 11. Kuznetsov B., Shalyto A. Realization of Boolean Formulas by Linear Binary Grafs. III.Optimization of Number and Total Length of Paths // Journal of Computer and Systems Sciences International. 1995. Vol. 34. No. 5.
- 12. Shalyto A. Algorithmic Graph Schemes and Transition Graphs: Their Use in Software Realization of Logical Control Algorithms. I // Automation and Remote Control. 1996. Vol. 57. No. 6, pp. 890–897.
- 13. Shalyto A. Algorithmic Graph Schemes and Transition Graphs: Their Use in Software Realization of Logical Control Algorithms. II // Automation and Remote Control, 1996, Vol. 57, No. 7, pp. 1027–1045.
- 14. Artyukhov V. L., Shalyto A. A. Realization of Boolean Formulas by Uniform Multiplexor and Majority Cascades // Journal of Computer and Systems Sciences International. 1996. Vol. 35. No 5, pp. 805–815.
- 15. Shalyto A. A. Modules with Paraphase the Input Variables That are Universal in Class of All Boolean Functions // Journal of Computer and Systems Sciences International. 1997. Vol. 36. No 5, pp. 794–801.
- 16. Kuznetsov B., Shalyto A. The Method of Independent Fragments for Construction of Linearized Structured Graf-Charts of Algorithms that Implement Systems of Boolean Formulas // Automation and Remote Control. 1998. Vol. 59. No 9, pp. 1317–1326.
- 17. Shalyto A. A. SWITCH-technology. Algorithmic and Programming Methods in Solution of Logic Control Problems. St. Petersburg: Nauka (Science), 1998. – 628 p. In Russian.http://is.ifmo.ru/books/switch/1
- 18. Kiselev V., Shalyto A. Study of Transidents in One-Contour Logical Circuits // Journal of Computer and Systems Sciences International. 1999. Vol. 38. No. 5, pp. 693–697.
- 19. Shalyto A., Software Automation Design: Algorithmization and Programming of Problems of Logical Control //Journal of Computer and Systems Sciences International. 2000. Vol. 39. No. 6, pp. 899–916.
- 20. Shalyto A. A. Logic Control. Hardware and Software Algorithm Implementation. St. Petersburg: Nauka (Science), 2000. – 780 p. In Russian.http://is.ifmo.ru/books/log_upr/1
- 21. Shalyto A. Logic Control and "Reactive" Systems: Algorithmization and Programming // Automation and Remote Control. 2001. Vol. 62. No. 1, pp. 1–29. online version.
- 22. Shalyto A., Tukkel N. SWITCH-Technology: An Automated Approach to Developing Software for Reactive Systems // Programming and Computer Software. 2001. Vol. 27. No. 5, pp. 260–276.
- 23. Shalyto A. A. Modules which Are Universal in the Class of Self-Dual Functions and in Close Classes // Journal of Computer and Systems Sciences International. 2001. Vol. 40. No 5, pp. 782–792.
- 24. Shalyto A., Tukkel N. Translating Iterative Algorithms into Automation Ones // Programming and Computer Software. 2002.

Vol. 28. No. 5, pp. 250–260.

- 25. Shalyto A. A. Realization of Boolean Formulas and Boolean Functions by Homogeneous Structures // Journal of Computer and Systems Sciences International. 2002. Vol. 41. No 2, p. 264-273.
- 26. Shalyto A. A. Multiplexor Method for Realization of Boolean Functions by Circuits Composed of Arbitrary Logical Elements // Journal of Computer and Systems Sciences International. 2003. Vol. 42. No 1, pp. 101–105.
- 27. Shalyto A. A. Decomposition of Boolean Functions with Respect to the Right-Most Input Variables of Truth Tables // Journal of Computer and Systems Sciences International. 2003. Vol.42. No 4, pp. 555–561.
- 28. Shalyto A. A. Methods for Constructing Multifunctional Logic Modules // Journal of Computer and Systems Sciences International. 2004. Vol. 43. No 6, pp. 923–935.
- 29. Shalyto A. Technology of Automata-Based Programming, 2004.
- 30. Shalyto A. Foundation for Open Project Documentation, 2004.
- 31. Naumov L. A., Shalyto A. A. Classification of Structures Generated by One-Dimensional Binary Cellular Automata from a Point Embryo // Journal of Computer and Systems Sciences International. 2005. Vol. 44. No. 5, pp. 800–807.
- 32. Yartsev B., Korneev G., Kotov V., Shalyto A. Automata-Based Programming of the Reactive Multi-Agent Control Systems /2005 International Conference on “Integration of Knowledge Intensive Multi-Agent Systems: Modeling, Exploration and Engineering”. KIMAS-05. Boston: IEEE Boston Section. 2005, pp. 449–453.
- 33. Gurov V., Mazin M., Narvsky A., Shalyto A. UniMod: Method and Tool for Development of Reactive Object-Oriented Programs with Explicit States Emphasis / Proceedings of St. Petersburg IEEE Chapters. 2005. International Conference “110 Anniversary of Radio Invention”, SPb ETU “LETI”, 2005, vol. 2, pp. 106–110.
- 34. Shalyto A. A. Multifunctional Logic Modules Consisting of Elements with Bilateral Conductance // Journal of Computer and Systems Sciences International. 2006. Vol. 45. No 1, pp. 73–76.
- 35. Paraschenko D., Shalyto A., Tsarev F. Modeling Technology for One Class of Multi-Agent Systems with Automata Based Programming / IEEE International Conference on Computational Intelligence for Measurement Systems and Applications (CIMSA 2006). 2006, pp. 35–41.
- 36. Shalyto A., Shamgunov N., Korneev G. State Machine Design Pattern / .NET Technologies 2006. Short papers. University of West Bohemia, pp. 51–58.
- 37. Gurov V. S., Mazin M. A., Narvsky A. S., Shalyto A. A. Tools for Support of Automata-Based Programming // Programming and Computer Software. 2007. Vol. 33. No. 6, pp. 343–355.
- 38. Lobanov P.G., Shalyto A.A. Application of Genetic Algorithms for Automatic Construction of Finite-State Automata in the Problem of Flibs // Journal of Computer and Systems Sciences International. 2007. Vol. 46. No. 5, pp. 792–801.
- 39. Bulletin of St Petersburg State University of Information Technologies, Mechanics and Optics. 2008. Volume 53. Automata-based programming. In Russian. https://web.archive.org/web/20110812192228/http://books.ifmo.ru/ntv/ntv/53/ntv_53.pdf
- 40. Polikarpova N. I., Shalyto A. A. Automata-based programming. SPb.: Piter. 2009, 2010, 2011. In Russian. http://is.ifmo.ru/books/_book.pdf
- 41. Polikarpova N., Tochilin V., Shalyto A. Method of Reduced Tables for Generation of Automata with a Large Number of Input Variables Based on Genetic Programming // Journal of Computer and Systems Sciences International. 2010. Vol. 49. No. 2, pp. 265–282.
- 42. Zakonov A., Stepanov O., Shalyto A. GA-based and Design by Contract Approach to Test Generation for EFSMs / Proceedings of IEEE East-West Design & Test Symposium (EWDTS’10). St. Petersburg. 2010, pp. 152–155.
- 43. Velder S., Lukin M., Shalyto A., Yaminov B. Verification of automaton programs. St. Petersburg: Nauka (Science), 2011. 242 p. In Russian.http://is.ifmo.ru/verification/velder_verification_posobie_nauka.pdf
- 44. Zakonov A., Shalyto A. Automatic Extraction and Verification of State-Models for Web Applications // Lecture Notes in Electrical Engineering. 2012. V.133. Part 1, pp. 157–160.
- 45. Chivilikhin D., Ulyantsev V., Shalyto A. Solving Five Instances of the Artificial Ant Problem with Ant Colony Optimization / Proceedings of the 2013 IFAC Conference on Manufacturing Modelling, Management and Control (MIM'13). SPb., Russia, 2013. Vol. 7. Part 1, pp. 1043–1048.
- 46. Aleksandrov A., Kazakov S., Sergushichev A., Tsarev F., Shalyto A. The Use of Evolutionary Programming Based on Training Examples for the Generation of Finite State Machines for Controlling Objects with Complex Behavior // Journal of Computer and Systems Sciences International. 2013. Vol. 52. No. 3, pp. 410–425.
- 47. Pang C., Patil S., Yang C., Vyatkin V., Shalyto A. A Portability Study of IEC 61499: Semantiac and Tools / Proceedings of the 12th IEEE International Conference on Industrial Informatics (INDIN'14). 2014, pp. 440–445.
- 48. Chivilikhin D., Ulyantsev V., Shalyto A. Combining Exact and Metaheuristic Techniques for Learning Extended Finite-State Machines from Test Scenarios and Temporal Properties / Proceedings of the 13th International Conference on Machine Learning and Applications (ICMLA'14). 2014, pp. 350–355.
- 49. Chivilikhin D., Ulyantsev V., Shalyto A. Extended Finite-State Machine Inference With Parallel Ant Colony Based Algorithms / Proceedings of the International Student Workshop on Bioinspired Optimization Methods and their Applications (BIOMA'14). 2014, pp. 117–126.
- 50. Buzhinsky I., Kazakov S., Ulyantsev V., Tsarev F., Shalyto A. Modification of the Method of Generation of Control Finite State Machines with Continuous Actions Based on Training Examples // Journal of Computer and Systems Sciences International. 2015. Vol. 54. No. 6, pp. 853–865.
- 51. Chivilikhin D., Shalyto A., Vyatkin V. Inferring Automata Logic From Manual Control Scenarios: Implementation in Function Blocks / Proceedings of the 13th IEEE International Symposium on Parallel and Distributed Processing with Applications (ISPA'15). 2015, pp. 307–312.
- 52. Chivilikhin D., Ivanov I., Shalyto A. Inferring Temporal Properties of Finite-State Machine Models with Genetic Programming / Proceedings of Genetic and Evolutionary Computation Conference. 2015, pp. 1185–1188.
- 53. Ulyantsev V., Zakirzyanov I., Shalyto A. BFS-based Symmetry Breaking Predicates for DFA Identification / Proceedings of the 9th International Conference on Language and Automata Theory and Applications (LATA-2015). 2015, pp. 611–622.
- 54. Chivilikhin D., Shalyto A., Patil S., Vyatkin V. Reconstruction of Function Block Logic using Metaheuristic Algorithm: Initial Explorations / Proceedings of the 13th IEEE International Conference on Industrial Informatics (INDIN'15). 2015, pp. 1239–1242.
- 55. Ulyantsev V., Zakirzyanov I., Shalyto A. Symmery Breaking Predicates for SAT-based DFA Identification. Cornell University Library. 2016. https://arxiv.org/abs/1602.05028
- 56. Ulyantsev V., Buzhinsky I., Shalyto A. Exact Finite-State Machine Identification from Scenarios and Temporal Properties. Cornell University Library. 2016. https://arxiv.org/abs/1601.06945
- 57. Chivilikhin D., Ulyantsev V., Shalyto A. Modified Ant Colony Algorithm for Constructing Finite State Machines from Execution Scenarios and Temporal Formulas // Automation and Remote Control. Vol. 77. 2016. No. 3, pp. 473–484.
- 58. Chivilikhin D., Ivanov I., Shalyto A., Vyatkin V. Reconstruction of Function Block Controllers Based on Test Scenarios and Verification / Proceedings of the 14th IEEE International Conference on Industrial Informatics (INDIN'16). 2016, pp. 646–651.
- 59. https://code.google.com/p/visio2python/
