= Richard Utley =

English cricketer

Personal information
- Full name: Richard Peter Hugh Utley
- Born: 11 February 1906; Havant, Hampshire, England
- Died: 28 August 1968 (aged 62); Ampleforth, Yorkshire, England
- Batting: Right-handed
- Bowling: Right-arm fast

Domestic team information
- Years: Team
- 1927–1928: Hampshire

Career statistics
Competition	First-class
Matches	31
Runs scored	210
Batting average	7.24
100s/50s	–/–
Top score	30
Balls bowled	4,450
Wickets	90
Bowling average	26.33
5 wickets in innings	4
10 wickets in match	1
Best bowling	6/43
Catches/stumpings	12/–
- Source: Cricinfo, 14 December 2009

Richard Peter Hugh Utley OBE (11 February 1906 — 28 August 1968) was an English first-class cricketer, Royal Air Force officer, Benedictine monk, and educator.

The son of Henry James Utley, he was born in Havant and was educated firstly in Portsmouth at St John's College, before attending Ampleforth College. There he played for the college cricket team and led the batting averages in his final year. From there, he attended the Royal Air Force College Cranwell and graduated into the Royal Air Force (RAF) as a pilot officer, with promotion to flying officer following in January 1928. Utley made his debut in first-class cricket for Hampshire against Kent at Southampton in the 1927 County Championship. He made 27 first-class appearances for Hampshire in 1927 and 1928, and had begun to build a reputation as a fast bowler. He took 79 wickets for Hampshire at an average of 26.32; he took four five wicket hauls and once took ten wickets in a match. His best innings bowling figures were 6 for 43 against Warwickshire. In addition to playing first-class cricket for Hampshire in 1927 and 1928, he also made three first-class appearances for the Royal Air Force cricket team (playing twice against the Royal Navy and once against the British Army) and once for the Gentlemen in the Gentlemen v Players fixture of 1927 at The Oval. For the RAF, he took 11 wickets at an average of 21.18, with best figures of 3 for 18.

In September 1928, Utley resigned his commission in the RAF and ended his first-class career in order to become a Benedictine monk. Having undertook holy orders, he became a master at Ampleforth School, where he was in charge of cricket from 1936 to 1955 and commanded the college's Combined Cadet Force for thirty years. Utley was made an OBE in the 1951 Birthday Honours. He died suddenly from a coronary thrombosis at Ampleforth on 28 August 1968.
