= Timothy C. Lethbridge =

Canadian computer scientist (born 1963)

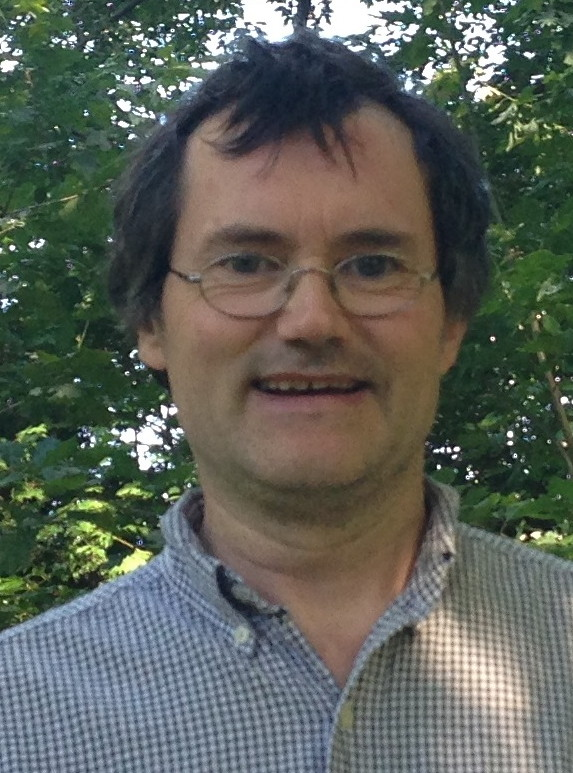
- Timothy C. Lethbridge, 2013
- Born: 1963 (age 62–63); London
- Education: University of New Brunswick, University of Ottawa
- Known for: Umple
- Scientific career
- Fields: Computer Science and Software Engineering
- Workplaces: University of Ottawa
- Doctoral advisor: Doug Skuce

Timothy Christian Lethbridge (born 1963) is a British/Canadian computer scientist and Professor of Computer Science and Software Engineering at University of Ottawa, known for his contributions in the fields of software engineering, knowledge management and computer animation, and the development of Umple.

== Biography ==
Born in London in 1963, Lethbridge grew up in Denmead and attended St John's College in Portsmouth until he immigrated with his family to Canada in 1975. He received his BSc in 1985 and his MSc in 1987 in Computer Science from the University of New Brunswick. In 1994, he received his PhD in Computer Science and Artificial Intelligence from the University of Ottawa under supervision of Douglas Skuce for a thesis about tools for knowledge management, entitled "Practical Techniques for Organizing and Measuring Knowledge."

In 1983, still studying, he started working as programmer and analyst for the Government of New Brunswick, where he assisted in the development of software for statistics, health insurance programs, and management information applications. At the university he also taught courses in Fortran programming and Interactive Computing. After graduation in 1987 he became researcher at the Bell-Northern Research, where he developed software for Computer Aided Design applications. From 1990 to 1995 he worked as consultant in multiple research projects.

In 1994 Lethbridge started his academic career at the department of computer science of the University of Ottawa as assistant professor, in 2001 associate professor, and since 2005 professor of computer science and software engineering at the University of Ottawa. He specializes in "Human Computer Interaction, Software Modeling, UML, Object Oriented Design, Software Engineering Education".

== Publications ==
Lethbridge published one textbook and over 100 articles. Books:

- 1994. Practical Techniques for Organizing and Measuring Knowledge. phd thesis, University of Ottawa.
- 2001. Object Oriented Software Engineering: Practical Software Development using UML and Java. With Robert Laganière. 2nd ed. 2005.

Articles, a selection:

- Anquetil, Nicolas, and Timothy C. Lethbridge. "Experiments with clustering as a software remodularization method." Reverse Engineering, 1999. Proceedings. Sixth Working Conference on. IEEE, 1999.
- Lethbridge, Timothy C. "What knowledge is important to a software professional?." Computer 33.5 (2000): 44-50.
- Forward, Andrew, and Timothy C. Lethbridge. "The relevance of software documentation, tools and technologies: a survey." Proceedings of the 2002 ACM symposium on Document engineering. ACM, 2002.
- Lethbridge, Timothy C., Janice Singer, and Andrew Forward. "How software engineers use documentation: The state of the practice." IEEE Software 20.6 (2003): 35-39.
- Lethbridge, Timothy C., Susan Elliott Sim, and Janice Singer. "Studying software engineers: Data collection techniques for software field studies." Empirical Software Engineering 10.3 (2005): 311-341.
