= Anthony Cleland Welch =

New Zealand politician (born 1945)

Anthony Cleland Welch OBE (born September 1945 in Hamilton, New Zealand) is a UK-based former soldier, UN official, politician and academic who has contributed to the debate on security sector reform (SSR) and post-conflict development and regeneration. Welch adheres to the view that it is not enough to merely reform the armed forces, police and justice sector. In 2006 he led the Internal Security Sector review of Kosovo (ISSR) which established the grounds for the creation of a democratically administered, civilian-led security sector in the unilaterally declared independent Republic of Kosovo. The ISSR took the unusual step of asking the population of Kosovo to have their say on what made them feel insecure and was called by the Organisation for Economic Co-operation and Development (OECD), "…one of the most ambitious and holistic efforts at SSR undertaken in recent years, both in scope and methodology.".

== Early years ==
Welch is the only son of Brian Desmond Joseph Welch, who was a member of the World War II Royal New Zealand Air Force Bomber Command aircrew, and saw action in the European and Pacific Theatres, and a British mother, Valerie Isabelle (Davison). Bettina Welch, the late Australia-based stage and television actress, was his aunt. He was educated at the Marist Brothers School in Hamilton, New Zealand and at Prior Park College, Bath and St John's College, Portsmouth in the UK. He gained a Doctorate of Philosophy, Masters of Arts and Science degrees at the University of Portsmouth. His first employment was with Rediffusion Television in Hong Kong as Assistant Commercial Manager. Later he moved with the company to become the Technical Sales Manager for Rediffusion Broadcasting in Singapore and Malaysia. He married twice, firstly to Victoria Mathews, who bore him two children, Simon Alexander Cleland Welch and Alexandra Victoria Cleland Welch. The marriage was dissolved in 1982. He later married Pamela Jane Darnell who predeceased him in January 2019.

== Military career ==
In 1969 Welch was commissioned into the Royal Army Ordnance Corps. He volunteered for Commando Training and, after passing the All Arms Commando Course at the Commando Training Centre Royal Marines (CTCRM), Lympstone joined the newly formed Commando Logistic Regiment Royal Marines. He also passed both the British and German parachute training courses. He was to serve with the Regiment for ten years, commanding the Ordnance Squadron and the Regiment in 1985/6. His other military appointments included Staff Captain Q, Headquarters 7th Armoured Brigade (1976/8), SO2, AQ Operations and Planning on the Quartermaster General London Staff (1983) and Commanding Officer, Falkland Islands Logistic Battalion (1984). He attended the British Army Staff College, Camberley and was a student on the second Higher Command and Staff Course. He taught at the Army and RAF Staff Colleges in 1987–88. In 1988 he was appointed Deputy Chief of Staff of the 3rd (UK) Armoured Division and, after working on the staff of the UK Military Commander, General Sir Peter de la Billière, as Deputy Chief of Staff (Land) during the first Gulf War, became the Commandant of Central Ordnance Depot Donnington and Commander of Donnington Garrison. He saw action in Northern Ireland, the Falklands Conflict and the first Gulf War. He took early retirement in the rank of Brigadier in 1993.

== Later work ==
After leaving the British Army, Welch joined the United Nations in Zagreb, Croatia. He was appointed chief of joint policy, planning and coordination for the United Nations Protection Force in Bosnia-Herzegovina and Croatia. He later became the assistant to the special representative of the secretary-general of the UN (SRSG) for the former Yugoslavia, Thorvald Stoltenberg and Yasushi Akashi. He then spent a year as general manager of Allmakes Projects Limited, a UK-based firm dealing with post-conflict and transitional state regeneration, before joining the European Union Monitoring Mission in the former Yugoslavia (EUMM) where he was head of the regional offices for Albania and Serbia-Montenegro. In 1997–98 he was the coordinator for the Organization for Security and Co-operation in Europe (OSCE) Election Observation Missions throughout the Balkans Region, covering elections in Albania, Bulgaria, Croatia, Montenegro, Romania and Serbia. He then joined the UK Department for International Development (DFID) as the conflict and security adviser to the Conflict and Humanitarian Affairs Department, working in South Africa, Sierra Leone, Ethiopia, the Solomon Islands and throughout the Balkans. In 1999 he opened the first DFID Office in Kosovo after the end of the conflict. In 2001, the UN SRSG, Bernard Kouchner, appointed him the UNMIK regional administrator for Mitrovica. In 2004 he stood for the European Parliament as a Liberal Democrat for the UK's South West Region and Gibraltar. Although second on the party list he was unsuccessful in gaining a seat. He however served for five years as a councillor for Havant Borough in Hampshire. In 2006, Welch led the UNDP Review of Internal Security in Kosovo (ISSR) which was undertaken in parallel with the UNOSEK final status negotiations in Vienna led by Martti Ahtisaari. He was a senior associate of the Centre for Security Sector Management at Cranfield University and taught post-graduate studies at Shrivenham, the Defence Academy of the United Kingdom, He has written a number of articles on security sector reform and post-conflict development and regeneration. He served as a governor of South Downs College between 2002 and 2012, acted as the strategic advisor to the Subrosa Group, a Trustee of the Centre for Southeastern European Studies (Centre for Black Sea Security Studies), Sofia and Vencorp Private Equity Institutional Fund, Geneva. He is a Senior Associate of the Folke Bernadotte Academy, Sweden, a Senior Fellow of the Centre for Security Governance, Canada, a Member of the Security, Conflict & International Development Panel of Experts, University of Leicester and a Member of Board of Experts, 1325 Policy Group, Sweden. He is a Fellow of the Institute of Directors and a Fellow of the British Institute of Management. In 2010 he became an adviser to Lord Chidgey, former Member of Parliament for Eastliegh and Liberal Democrat spokesperson in the House of Lords on international aid and development and UK foreign policy for Africa. In 2012 he walked the 500-mile (804 km) Camino de Santiago de Compostela from the French Pyrenees to the shrine of St James in Spain. in retirement, Welch remains active as an adviser on conflict, security and justice for the UK Government and as a part-time tutor at the University of Portsmouth.
