= Zenna Hopson =

British businesswoman (born 1965)

Zenna Hopson (born 30 September 1965) is a British businesswoman and public speaker who consults on education.

Hopson held positions as the first chairwoman of OFSTED and as chairwoman of the Royal Navy Audit Committee and was chair of governors of St John's College, Portsmouth in 2022 when the decision to close it was made.

Hopson won the Ernst & Young Entrepreneur of the Year Award in 2000 and in 2003, she received an Honorary Degree from the University of Portsmouth.

== Personal life ==
Hopson is the niece of the Romanian-British Intelligence officer Vera Atkins CBE.
