= Flip-flop (electronics) =

Electronic circuit with two stable states

An SR latch (R1, R2 = 1 kΩ; R3, R4 = 10 kΩ)

In electronics, flip-flops and latches are circuits that have two stable states that can store state information – a bistable multivibrator. The circuit can be made to change state by signals applied to one or more control inputs and will output its state (often along with its logical complement). It is the basic storage element in sequential logic. Flip-flops and latches are fundamental building blocks of digital electronics systems used in computers, communications, and many other types of systems.

Flip-flops and latches are used as data storage elements to store a single bit (binary digit) of data; one of its two states represents a one and the other represents a zero. Such data storage can be used for storage of state, and such a circuit is described as sequential logic in electronics. When used in a finite-state machine, the output and next state depend not only on its current input, but also on its current state (and hence, previous inputs). It can also be used for counting of pulses, and for synchronizing variably-timed input signals to some reference timing signal.

The term flip-flop has historically referred generically to both level-triggered (asynchronous, transparent, or opaque) and edge-triggered (synchronous, or clocked) circuits that store a single bit of data using gates. Modern authors reserve the term flip-flop exclusively for edge-triggered storage elements and latches for level-triggered ones. The terms edge-triggered, and level-triggered may be used to avoid ambiguity.

When a level-triggered latch is enabled, it becomes transparent, but an edge-triggered flip-flop's output only changes on a clock edge (either positive going or negative going).

Different types of flip-flops and latches are available as integrated circuits, usually with multiple elements per chip. For example, 74HC75 is a quadruple transparent latch in the 7400 series.

Low power flip-flops are designed for low-power electronics.

== History ==
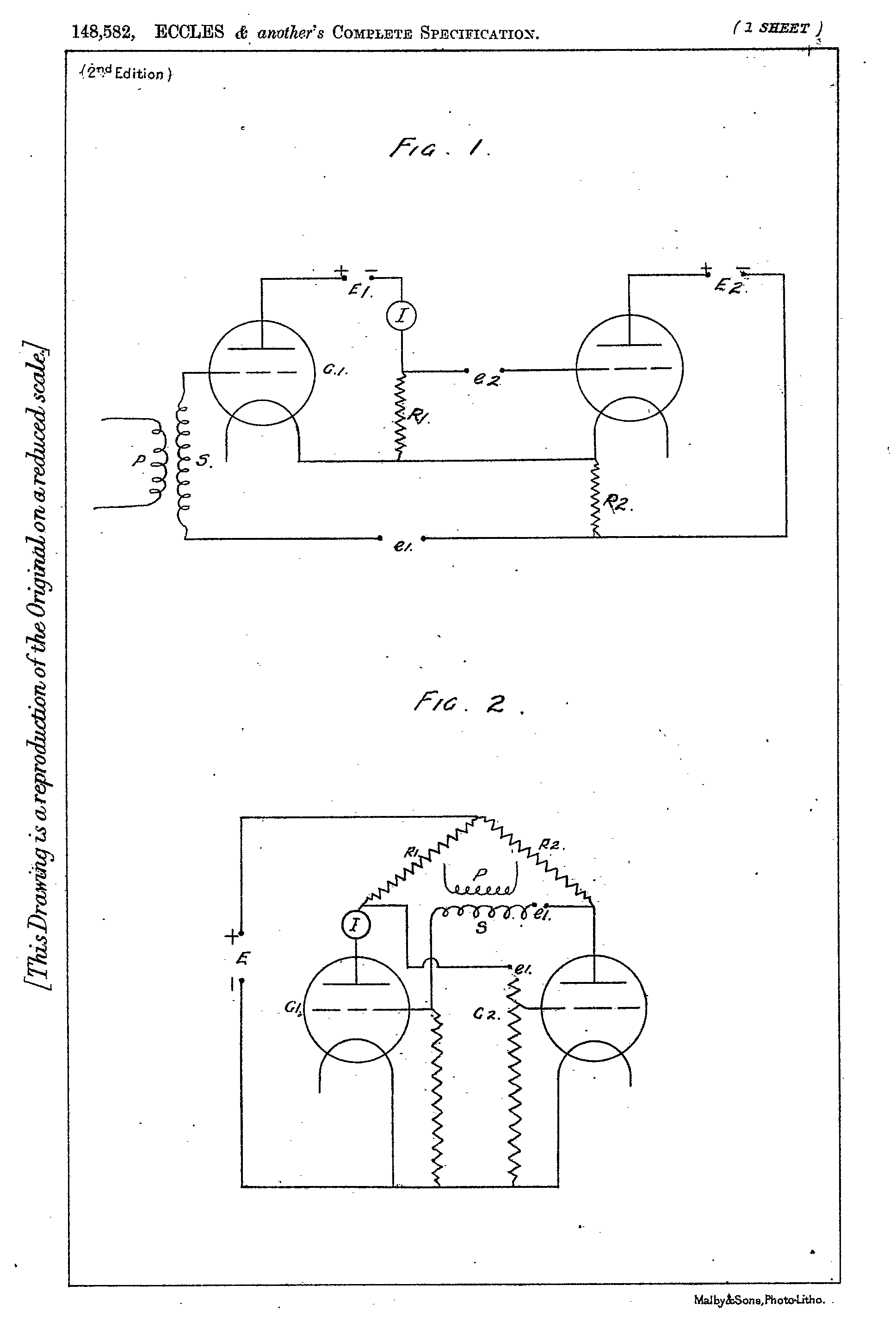
Schematics from the Eccles and Jordan trigger relay patent filed 1918, one drawn as a cascade of amplifiers with a positive feedback path, and the other as a symmetric cross-coupled pair

The first electronic latch was invented in 1918 by the British physicists William Eccles and F. W. Jordan. It was initially called the Eccles–Jordan trigger circuit and consisted of two active elements (vacuum tubes). The design was used in the 1943 British Colossus codebreaking computer and such circuits and their transistorized versions were common in computers even after the introduction of integrated circuits, though latches and flip-flops made from logic gates are also common now. Early latches were known variously as trigger circuits or multivibrators.

According to P. L. Lindley, an engineer at the US Jet Propulsion Laboratory, the flip-flop types detailed below (SR, D, T, JK) were first discussed in a 1954 UCLA course on computer design by Montgomery Phister, and then appeared in his book Logical Design of Digital Computers. Lindley was at the time working at Hughes Aircraft under Eldred Nelson, who had coined the term JK for a flip-flop which changed states when both inputs were on (a logical one). The other names were coined by Phister. They differ slightly from some of the definitions given below. Lindley explains that he heard the story of the JK flip-flop from Eldred Nelson, who is responsible for coining the term while working at Hughes Aircraft. Flip-flops in use at Hughes at the time were all of the type that came to be known as J-K. In designing a logical system, Nelson assigned letters to flip-flop inputs as follows: #1: A & B, #2: C & D, #3: E & F, #4: G & H, #5: J & K. Nelson used the notations j-input and k-input in a patent application filed in 1953.

== Implementation ==
A transparent latch circuit based on bipolar junction transistors

Transparent or asynchronous latches can be built around a single pair of cross-coupled inverting elements: vacuum tubes, bipolar transistors, field-effect transistors, inverters, and inverting logic gates have all been used in practical circuits.

Clocked flip-flops are specially designed for synchronous systems; such devices ignore their inputs except at the transition of a dedicated clock signal (known as clocking, pulsing, or strobing). Clocking causes the flip-flop either to change or to retain its output signal based upon the values of the input signals at the transition. Some flip-flops change output on the rising edge of the clock, others on the falling edge.

Since the elementary amplifying stages are inverting, two stages can be connected in succession (as a cascade) to form the needed non-inverting amplifier. In this configuration, each amplifier may be considered as an active inverting feedback network for the other inverting amplifier. Thus the two stages are connected in a non-inverting loop although the circuit diagram is usually drawn as a symmetric cross-coupled pair (both the drawings are initially introduced in the Eccles–Jordan patent).

== Types ==
Flip-flops and latches can be divided into common types: SR (set-reset), D (data), T (toggle), and JK (see History section above). The behavior of a particular type can be described by the characteristic equation that derives the next output (Q_{next}) in terms of the input signal(s) and/or the current output, $Q$.

=== Asynchronous set-reset latches ===
When using static gates as building blocks, the most fundamental latch is the asynchronous set-reset (SR) latch.

Its two inputs S and R can set the internal state to 1 using the combination S=1 and R=0, and can reset the internal state to 0 using the combination S=0 and R=1. (Note: Alternatively, the two inputs may be called set 1 and set 0, which may clear confusion for some: the term set alone may be misunderstood as setting the bit to the input provided to set. This naming also makes it intuitive in the explanation below that trying to set 0 and 1 at the same time should make the SR latch behave unpredictably.)

The SR latch can be constructed from a pair of cross-coupled NOR or NAND logic gates. The stored bit is present on the output marked Q.

It is convenient to think of NAND, NOR, AND and OR as controlled operations, where one input is chosen as the control input set and the other bit as the input to be processed depending on the state of the control. Then, all of these gates have one control value that ignores the input (x) and outputs a constant value, while the other control value lets the input pass (maybe complemented):

$$\begin{align}
\operatorname{NAND}(x,0) &= 1       &  \operatorname{NAND}(x,1) & = \bar{x} \\
\operatorname{NOR} (x,0) &= \bar{x} &  \operatorname{NOR}(x,1)  & = 0       \\
\operatorname{AND} (x,0) &= 0       &  \operatorname{AND}(x,1)  & = {x}     \\
\operatorname{OR}  (x,0) &= x       &  \operatorname{OR} (x,1)  & = 1       \\
\end{align}$$

Essentially, they can all be used as switches that either set a specific value or let an input value pass.

==== SR NOR latch ====
An animation of an SR latch, constructed from a pair of cross-coupled NOR gates. Red and black mean logical '1' and '0', respectively.

An animated SR latch. Black and white mean logical '1' and '0', respectively.: 1. S = 1, R = 0: Set; 2. S = 0, R = 0: Hold; 3. S = 0, R = 1: Reset; 4. S = 1, R = 1: Not allowed; Transitioning from the restricted combination (D) to (A) leads to an unstable state.

The SR NOR latch consists of two parallel NOR gates where the output of each NOR is also fanned out into one input of the other NOR, as shown in the figure. We call these output-to-input connections feedback inputs, or simply feedbacks. The remaining inputs we will use as control inputs as explained above. Notice that at this point, because everything is symmetric, it does not matter to which inputs the outputs are connected. We now break the symmetry by choosing which of the remaining control inputs will be our set and reset and we can call set NOR the NOR gate with the set control and reset NOR the NOR with the reset control; in the figures the set NOR is the bottom one and the reset NOR is the top one. The output of the reset NOR will be our stored bit Q, while we will see that the output of the set NOR stores its complement Q̅.

To derive the behavior of the SR NOR latch, consider S and R as control inputs and remember that, from the equations above, set and reset NOR with control 1 will fix their outputs to 0, while set and reset NOR with control 0 will act as a NOT gate. With this it is now possible to derive the behavior of the SR latch as simple conditions (instead of, for example, assigning values to each line see how they propagate):

- While the R and S are both zero, both R NOR and S NOR simply impose the feedback being the complement of the output, this is satisfied as long as the outputs are the complement of each other. Thus the outputs Q and Q̅ are maintained in a constant state, whether Q=0 or Q=1.
- If S=1 while R=0, then the set NOR will fix Q̅=0, while the reset NOR will adapt and set Q=1. Once S is set back to zero the values are maintained as explained above.
- Similarly, if R=1 while S=0, then the reset NOR fixes Q=0 while the set NOR with adapt Q̅=1. Again the state is maintained if R is set back to 0.
- If R=S=1, the NORs will fix both outputs to 0, which is not a valid state storing complementary values.

SR latch operation
Characteristic table				Excitation table			
S	R	Q_{next}	Action	Q	Q_{next}	S	R
0	0	Q	Hold state	0	0	0	X
0	1	0	Reset	0	1	1	0
1	0	1	Set	1	0	0	1
1	1	X	Not allowed	1	1	X	0

Note: X means don't care, that is, either 0 or 1 is a valid value.

The R = S = 1 combination is called a restricted combination or a forbidden state because, as both NOR gates then output zeros, it breaks the logical equation Q = not Q̅. The combination is also inappropriate in circuits where both inputs may go low simultaneously (i.e. a transition from restricted to hold). The output could remain in a metastable state and may eventually lock at either 1 or 0 depending on the propagation time relations between the gates (a race condition).

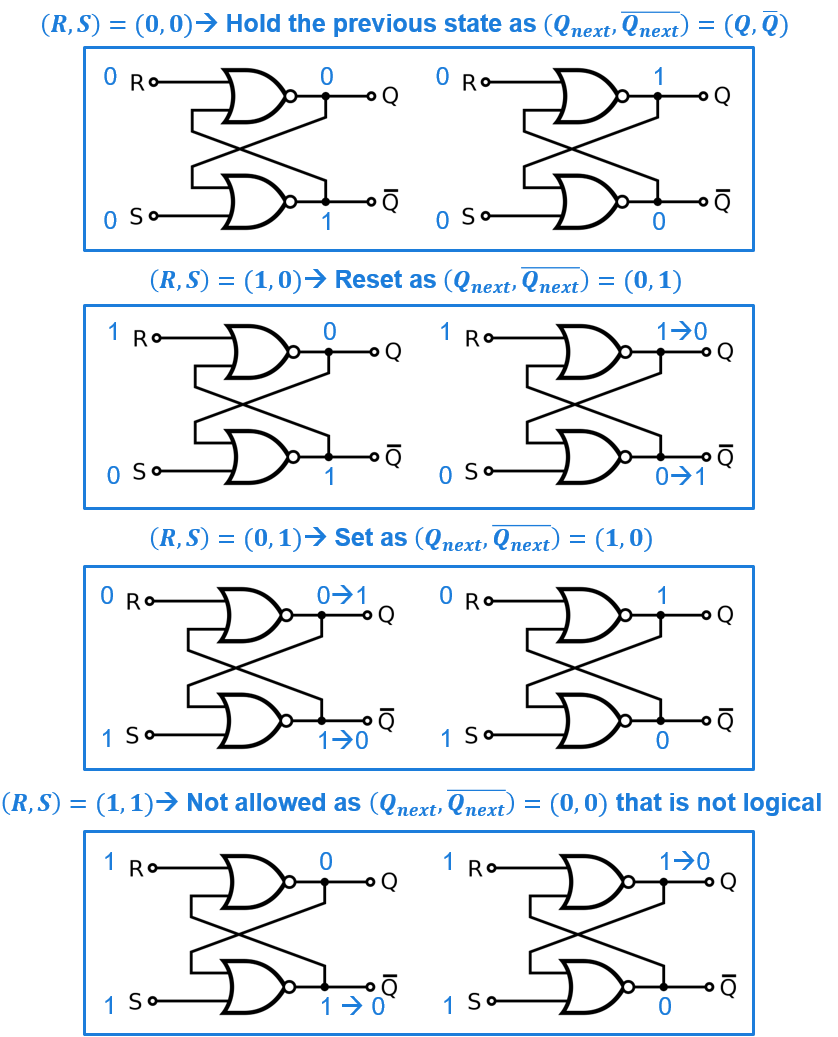
How an SR NOR latch works

To overcome the restricted combination, one can add gates to the inputs that would convert (S, R) = (1, 1) to one of the non-restricted combinations. That can be:

- Q = 1 (1, 0) – referred to as an S (dominated)-latch
- Q = 0 (0, 1) – referred to as an R (dominated)-latch

This is done in nearly every programmable logic controller.

- Hold state (0, 0) – referred to as an E-latch

Alternatively, the restricted combination can be made to toggle the output. The result is the JK latch.

The characteristic equation for the SR latch is:

$Q_\text{next} = \bar{R}Q + \bar{R}S$ or $Q_\text{next} = \bar{R}(Q + S).$

where A + B means (A or B), AB means (A and B)

Another expression is:

$Q_\text{next} = S + \bar{R}Q$ with $SR = 0$

==== S̅R̅ NAND latch ====
An S̅R̅ latch constructed from cross-coupled NAND gates

The circuit shown below is a basic NAND latch. The inputs are also generally designated S̅ and R̅ for Set and Reset respectively. Because the NAND inputs must normally be logic 1 to avoid affecting the latching action, the inputs are considered to be inverted in this circuit (or active low).

The circuit uses the same feedback as SR NOR, just replacing NOR gates with NAND gates, to remember and retain its logical state even after the controlling input signals have changed. Again, recall that a 0-controlled NAND always outputs 1, while a 1-controlled NAND acts as a NOT gate. When the S and R inputs are both high, feedback maintains the Q outputs to the previous state. When either is zero, they fix their output bits to 0 while to other adapts to the complement. S̅=R̅=0 produces the invalid state.

S̅R̅ latch operation
S̅	R̅	Action
0	0	Q = 1, Q̅ = 1; not allowed
0	1	Q = 1
1	0	Q = 0
1	1	No change; random initial

Symbol for an S̅R̅ NAND latch

==== SR AND-OR latch ====
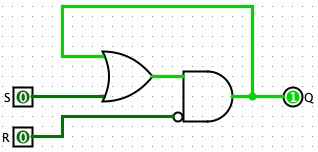
An SR AND-OR latch. Light green means logical 1 and dark green means logical 0. The latch is currently in hold mode (no change).

From a teaching point of view, SR latches drawn as a pair of cross-coupled components (transistors, gates, tubes, etc.) are often hard to understand for beginners. A didactically easier explanation is to draw the latch as a single feedback loop instead of the cross-coupling. The following is an SR latch built with an AND gate with one inverted input and an OR gate. Note that the inverter is not needed for the latch functionality, but rather to make both inputs high-active.

SR AND-OR latch operation
S	R	Action
0	0	No change; random initial
1	0	Q = 1
X	1	Q = 0

Note that the SR AND-OR latch has the benefit that S = 1, R = 1 is well defined. In above version of the SR AND-OR latch it gives priority to the R signal over the S signal. If priority of S over R is needed, this can be achieved by connecting output Q to the output of the OR gate instead of the output of the AND gate.

The SR AND-OR latch is easier to understand, because both gates can be explained in isolation, again with the control view of AND and OR from above. When neither S or R is set, then both the OR gate and the AND gate are in "hold mode", i.e., they let the input through, their output is the input from the feedback loop. When input S = 1, then the OR gate outputs 1, regardless of the other input from the feedback loop ("set mode"). When input R = 1 then the AND gate outputs 0, regardless of the other input from the feedback loop ("reset mode"). And since the AND gate takes the output of the OR gate as input, R has priority over S. Latches drawn as cross-coupled gates may look less intuitive, as the behavior of one gate appears to be intertwined with the other gate. The standard NOR or NAND latches could also be re-drawn with the feedback loop, but in their case the feedback loop does not show the same signal value throughout the whole feedback loop. However, the SR AND-OR latch has the drawback that it would need an extra inverter, if an inverted Q output is needed.

Note that the SR AND-OR latch can be transformed into the SR NOR latch using logic transformations: inverting the output of the OR gate and also the 2nd input of the AND gate and connecting the inverted Q output between these two added inverters; with the AND gate with both inputs inverted being equivalent to a NOR gate according to De Morgan's laws.

==== JK latch ====
The JK latch is much less frequently used than the JK flip-flop. The JK latch follows the following state table:

JK latch truth table
J	K	Q_{next}	Comment
0	0	Q	No change
0	1	0	Reset
1	0	1	Set
1	1	Q̅	Toggle

Hence, the JK latch is an SR latch that is made to toggle its output (oscillate between 0 and 1) when passed the input combination of 11. Unlike the JK flip-flop, the 11 input combination for the JK latch is not very useful because there is no clock that directs toggling.

=== Gated latches and conditional transparency ===
Latches are designed to be transparent. That is, input signal changes cause immediate changes in output. Additional logic can be added to a transparent latch to make it non-transparent or opaque when another input (an enable input) is not asserted.

A periodic enable input signal may be called a write strobe. When the enable input is a clock signal, the latch is said to be level-sensitive (to the level of the clock signal), as opposed to edge-sensitive like flip-flops below.

When several transparent latches follow each other, if they are all transparent at the same time, signals will propagate through them all. However, following a transparent-high latch by a transparent-low latch (or vice-versa) causes the state and output to only change on clock edges, forming what is called a master–slave flip-flop.

==== Gated SR latch ====
NAND gated S̅R̅ latch. Note the inverted inputs.

A gated SR latch circuit diagram constructed from AND gates (on left) and NOR gates (on right)

A gated SR latch can be made by adding a second level of NAND gates to an inverted SR latch. The extra NAND gates further invert the inputs so a S̅R̅ latch becomes a gated SR latch (a SR latch would transform into a gated S̅R̅ latch with inverted enable).

Alternatively, a gated SR latch (with non-inverting enable) can be made by adding a second level of AND gates to a SR latch.

With E high (enable true), the signals can pass through the input gates to the encapsulated latch; all signal combinations except for (0, 0) = hold then immediately reproduce on the (Q, Q̅) output, i.e. the latch is transparent.

With E low (enable false) the latch is closed (opaque) and remains in the state it was left the last time E was high.

Gated SR latch operation
E	Action
0	No action (hold state)
1	The same as non-gated SR latch

Symbol for a gated SR latch

==== Gated D latch ====
This latch exploits the fact that, in the two active input combinations (01 and 10) of a gated SR latch, R is the complement of S. The input NAND stage converts the two D input states (0 and 1) to these two input combinations for the next S̅R̅ latch by inverting the data input signal. The low state of the enable signal produces the inactive 11 combination. Thus a gated D-latch may be considered as a one-input synchronous SR latch. This configuration prevents application of the restricted input combination. It is also known as transparent latch, data latch, or simply gated latch. It has a data input and an enable signal (sometimes named clock, or control). The word transparent comes from the fact that, when the enable input is on, the signal propagates directly through the circuit, from the input D to the output Q. Gated D-latches are also level-sensitive with respect to the level of the clock or enable signal.

Transparent latches are typically used as I/O ports or in asynchronous systems, or in synchronous two-phase systems (synchronous systems that use a two-phase clock), where two latches operating on different clock phases prevent data transparency as in a master–slave flip-flop.

The truth table below shows that when the enable input is 0, the D input has no effect on the output. When E is high, the output equals D.

Gated D latch truth table
E	D	Q	Q̅	Comment
0	X	Q_{prev}	Q̅_{prev}	No change
1	0	0	1	Reset
1	1	1	0	Set

Symbol for a gated D latch

A gated D latch based on an S̅R̅ NAND latch

A gated D latch based on an SR NOR latch

An animated gated D latch. Black and white mean logical '1' and '0', respectively.
1. D = 1, E = 1: set
2. D = 1, E = 0: hold
3. D = 0, E = 0: hold
4. D = 0, E = 1: reset

A gated D latch in pass transistor logic that is write-enabled when CLK=1, similar to the ones in the CD4042 or the CD74HC75 integrated circuits

==== Earle latch ====
The classic gated latch designs have some undesirable characteristics. They require dual-rail logic or an inverter. The input-to-output propagation may take up to three gate delays. The input-to-output propagation is not constant – some outputs take two gate delays while others take three.

Designers looked for alternatives. A successful alternative is the Earle latch. It requires only a single data input, and its output takes a constant two gate delays. In addition, the two gate levels of the Earle latch can, in some cases, be merged with the last two gate levels of the circuits driving the latch because many common computational circuits have an OR layer followed by an AND layer as their last two levels. Merging the latch function can implement the latch with no additional gate delays. The merge is commonly exploited in the design of pipelined computers, and, in fact, was originally developed by John G. Earle to be used in the IBM System/360 Model 91 for that purpose.

The Earle latch is hazard free. If the middle NAND gate is omitted, then one gets the polarity hold latch, which is commonly used because it demands less logic. However, it is susceptible to logic hazard. Intentionally skewing the clock signal can avoid the hazard.

Earle latch uses complementary enable inputs: enable active low (E_L) and enable active high (E_H)

An animated Earle latch. Black and white mean logical '1' and '0', respectively.
1. D = 1, E_H = 1: set
2. D = 0, E_H = 1: reset
3. D = 1, E_H = 0: hold

=== D flip-flop ===
D flip-flop symbol

The D flip-flop is widely used, and known as a data flip-flop. The D flip-flop captures the value of the D-input at a definite portion of the clock cycle (such as the rising edge of the clock). That captured value becomes the Q output. At other times, the output Q does not change. The D flip-flop can be viewed as a memory cell, a zero-order hold, or a delay line.

Truth table:

Clock	D	Q_{next}
Rising edge	0	0
Rising edge	1	1
Non-rising	X	Q

(X denotes a don't care condition, meaning the signal is irrelevant)

Most D-type flip-flops in ICs have the capability to be forced to the set or reset state (which ignores the D and clock inputs). Usually, the S = R = 1 condition (illegal in SR latches) is resolved in D-type flip-flops. Setting S = R = 0 makes the flip-flop behave as described above. Here is the truth table for the other possible S and R configurations:

Inputs				Outputs	
S	R	D	>	Q	Q̅
0	1	X	X	0	1
1	0	X	X	1	0
1	1	X	X	1	1

4-bit serial-in, parallel-out (SIPO) shift register

These flip-flops are very useful, as they form the basis for shift registers, which are an essential part of many electronic devices. The advantage of the D flip-flop over the D-type transparent latch is that the signal on the D input pin is captured the moment the flip-flop is clocked, and subsequent changes on the D input will be ignored until the next clock event. An exception is that some flip-flops have a reset signal input, which will reset Q (to zero), and may be either asynchronous or synchronous with the clock.

The above circuit shifts the contents of the register to the right, one bit position on each active transition of the clock. The input X is shifted into the leftmost bit position.

==== Classical positive-edge-triggered D flip-flop ====
A few different types of edge triggered D flip‑flops

A positive-edge-triggered D flip-flop

A positive-edge-triggered D flip-flop with set and reset

This circuit consists of two stages implemented by S̅R̅ NAND latches. The input stage (the two latches on the left) processes the clock and data signals to ensure correct input signals for the output stage (the single latch on the right). If the clock is low, both the output signals of the input stage are high regardless of the data input; the output latch is unaffected and it stores the previous state. When the clock signal changes from low to high, only one of the output voltages (depending on the data signal) goes low and sets/resets the output latch: if D = 0, the lower output becomes low; if D = 1, the upper output becomes low. As long as the clock signal stays high, these input-stage outputs keep their states regardless of the data input and force the output latch to stay in the corresponding state, as the input logical zero (of the output stage) remains active while the clock is high. Any change of the data input while the clock is high will not change the states of the two input-stage latches. Hence the role of the output latch is to store the data only while the clock is low.

The circuit is closely related to the gated D latch as both the circuits convert the two D input states (0 and 1) to two input combinations (01 and 10) for the output S̅R̅ latch by inverting the data input signal (both the circuits split the single D signal in two complementary S̅ and R̅ signals). The difference is that NAND logical gates are used in the gated D latch, while S̅R̅ NAND latches are used in the positive-edge-triggered D flip-flop. The role of these latches is to lock the active output producing low voltage (a logical zero); thus the positive-edge-triggered D flip-flop can also be thought of as a gated D latch with latched input gates.

==== Master–slave edge-triggered D flip-flop ====
A master–slave D flip-flop. It responds on the falling edge of the enable input (usually a clock).

An implementation of a master–slave D flip-flop that is triggered on the rising edge of the clock

A master–slave D flip-flop is created by connecting two gated D latches in series, and inverting the enable input to one of them. It is called master–slave because the master latch controls the slave latch's output value Q and forces the slave latch to hold its value whenever the slave latch is enabled, as the slave latch always copies its new value from the master latch and changes its value only in response to a change in the value of the master latch and clock signal.

For a positive-edge triggered master–slave D flip-flop, when the clock signal is low (logical 0) the enable seen by the first or master D latch (the inverted clock signal) is high (logical 1). This allows the master latch to store the input value when the clock signal transitions from low to high. As the clock signal goes high (0 to 1) the inverted enable of the first latch goes low (1 to 0) and the value seen at the input to the master latch is locked. Nearly simultaneously, the twice inverted enable of the second or slave D latch transitions from low to high (0 to 1) with the clock signal. This allows the signal captured at the rising edge of the clock by the now locked master latch to pass through the slave latch. When the clock signal returns to low (1 to 0), the output of the slave latch is locked, and the value seen at the last rising edge of the clock is held while the master latch begins to accept new values in preparation for the next rising clock edge.

Removing the leftmost inverter in the circuit creates a D-type flip-flop that captures the D input on the falling edge of the clock signal. This has a truth table like this:

D	Q	>	Q_{next}
0	X	Falling	0
1	X	Falling	1

==== Dual-edge-triggered D flip-flop ====
An implementation of a dual-edge-triggered D flip-flop

Flip-Flops that read in a new value on the rising and the falling edge of the clock are called dual-edge-triggered flip-flops. Such a flip-flop may be built using two single-edge-triggered D-type flip-flops and a multiplexer, or by using two single-edge triggered D-type flip-flops and three XOR gates.

Circuit symbol of a dual-edge-triggered D flip-flop

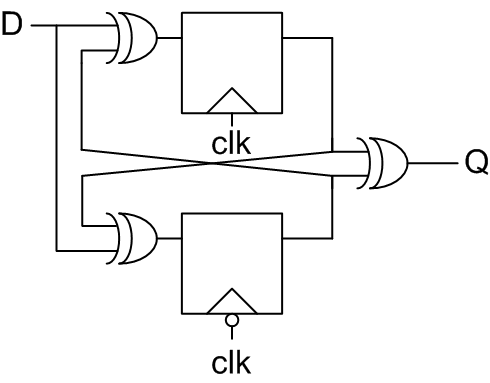
A dual-edge triggered D flip-flop implemented using XOR gates, and no multiplexer

==== Edge-triggered dynamic D storage element ====
A CMOS IC implementation of a dynamic edge-triggered flip-flop with reset

An efficient functional alternative to a D flip-flop can be made with dynamic circuits (where information is stored in a capacitance) as long as it is clocked often enough; while not a true flip-flop, it is still called a flip-flop for its functional role. While the master–slave D element is triggered on the edge of a clock, its components are each triggered by clock levels. The edge-triggered D flip-flop, as it is called even though it is not a true flip-flop, does not have the master–slave properties.

Edge-triggered D flip-flops are often implemented in integrated high-speed operations using dynamic logic. This means that the digital output is stored on parasitic device capacitance while the device is not transitioning. This design facilitates resetting by simply discharging one or more internal nodes. A common dynamic flip-flop variety is the true single-phase clock (TSPC) type which performs the flip-flop operation with little power and at high speeds. However, dynamic flip-flops will typically not work at static or low clock speeds: given enough time, leakage paths may discharge the parasitic capacitance enough to cause the flip-flop to enter invalid states.

=== T flip-flop ===
A circuit symbol for a T-type flip-flop

If the T input is high, the T flip-flop changes state ("toggles") on the triggering clock edge. If the T input is low, the flip-flop holds the previous value. This behavior is described by the characteristic equation:

$Q_\text{next} = T \oplus Q = T\overline{Q} + \overline{T}Q$ (expanding the XOR operator)

and can be described in a truth table:

T flip-flop operation
Characteristic table				Excitation table			
$T$	$Q$	$Q_\text{next}$	Comment	$Q$	$Q_\text{next}$	$T$	Comment
0	0	0	Hold state (no clock)	0	0	0	No change
0	1	1	Hold state (no clock)	1	1	0	No change
1	0	1	Toggle	0	1	1	Complement
1	1	0	Toggle	1	0	1	Complement

When T is held high, the toggle flip-flop divides the clock frequency by two; that is, if clock frequency is 4 MHz, the output frequency obtained from the flip-flop will be 2 MHz. This "divide by" feature has application in various types of digital counters. A T flip-flop can also be built using a JK flip-flop (J & K pins are connected together and act as T) or a D flip-flop (T input XOR Q_{previous} drives the D input).

=== JK flip-flop ===
A circuit symbol for a positive-edge-triggered JK flip-flop

JK flip-flop timing diagram

The JK flip-flop behaves like an edge-triggered SR flip-flop (J: Set, K: Reset) that replaces the illegal S = R = 1 condition with a flip or toggle command. Specifically, the combination J = 1, K = 0 is a command to set the flip-flop on the triggering clock edge; the combination J = 0, K = 1 is a command to reset the flip-flop on the triggering clock edge; and the combination J = K = 1 is a command to toggle the flip-flop (i.e., change its output to the logical complement of its current value) on the triggering clock edge. Setting J = K = 0 maintains the current state.

The characteristic equation of the JK flip-flop is:

$$Q_\text{next} = J\overline Q + \overline KQ$$

and the corresponding truth table is:

JK flip-flop operation
Characteristic table				Excitation table				
J	K	Comment	Q_{next}	Q	Q_{next}	Comment	J	K
0	0	Hold state	Q	0	0	No change	0	X
0	1	Reset	0	0	1	Set	1	X
1	0	Set	1	1	0	Reset	X	1
1	1	Toggle	Q̅	1	1	No change	X	0

The JK flip-flop is considered a universal flip-flop, because it can be configured to work as an SR flip-flop, a D flip-flop, or a T flip-flop. For instance, to synthesize a D flip-flop, simply set K equal to the complement of J (input J will act as input D). Similarly, to synthesize a T flip-flop, set K equal to J.

== Timing considerations ==
=== Timing parameters ===
Flip-flop setup, hold and clock-to-output timing parameters

The input must be held steady in a period around the rising edge of the clock known as the aperture. Imagine taking a picture of a frog on a lily pad. Suppose the frog then jumps into the water. If you take a picture of the frog as it jumps into the water, you will get a blurry picture of the frog jumping into the water—it's not clear which state the frog was in. But if you take a picture while the frog sits steadily on the pad (or is steadily in the water), you will get a clear picture. In the same way, the input to a flip-flop must be held steady during the aperture of the flip-flop.

Setup time is the minimum amount of time the data input should be held steady before the clock event, so that the data is reliably sampled by the clock.

Hold time is the minimum amount of time the data input should be held steady after the clock event, so that the data is reliably sampled by the clock.

Aperture is the sum of setup and hold time. The data input should be held steady throughout this time period.

Recovery time is the minimum amount of time the asynchronous set or reset input should be inactive before the clock event, so that the data is reliably sampled by the clock. The recovery time for the asynchronous set or reset input is thereby similar to the setup time for the data input.

Removal time is the minimum amount of time the asynchronous set or reset input should be inactive after the clock event, so that the data is reliably sampled by the clock. The removal time for the asynchronous set or reset input is thereby similar to the hold time for the data input.

Short impulses applied to asynchronous inputs (set, reset) should not be applied completely within the recovery-removal period, or else it becomes entirely indeterminable whether the flip-flop will transition to the appropriate state. In another case, where an asynchronous signal simply makes one transition that happens to fall between the recovery/removal time, eventually the flip-flop will transition to the appropriate state, but a very short glitch may or may not appear on the output, dependent on the synchronous input signal. This second situation may or may not have significance to a circuit design.

Set and Reset (and other) signals may be either synchronous or asynchronous and therefore may be characterized with either Setup/Hold or Recovery/Removal times, and synchronicity is very dependent on the design of the flip-flop.

Differentiation between Setup/Hold and Recovery/Removal times is often necessary when verifying the timing of larger circuits because asynchronous signals may be found to be less critical than synchronous signals. The differentiation offers circuit designers the ability to define the verification conditions for these types of signals independently.

=== Metastability ===
Flip-flops are subject to a problem called metastability, which can happen when two inputs, such as data and clock or clock and reset, are changing at about the same time. When the order is not clear, within appropriate timing constraints, the result is that the output may behave unpredictably, taking many times longer than normal to settle to one state or the other, or even oscillating several times before settling. Theoretically, the time to settle down is not bounded. In a computer system, this metastability can cause corruption of data or a program crash if the state is not stable before another circuit uses its value; in particular, if two different logical paths use the output of a flip-flop, one path can interpret it as a 0 and the other as a 1 when it has not resolved to stable state, putting the machine into an inconsistent state.

The metastability in flip-flops can be avoided by ensuring that the data and control inputs are held valid and constant for specified periods before and after the clock pulse, called the setup time (t_{su}) and the hold time (t_{h}) respectively. These times are specified in the data sheet for the device, and are typically between a few nanoseconds and a few hundred picoseconds for modern devices. Depending upon the flip-flop's internal organization, it is possible to build a device with a zero (or even negative) setup or hold time requirement but not both simultaneously.

Unfortunately, it is not always possible to meet the setup and hold criteria, because the flip-flop may be connected to a real-time signal that could change at any time, outside the control of the designer. In this case, the best the designer can do is to reduce the probability of error to a certain level, depending on the required reliability of the circuit. One technique for suppressing metastability is to connect two or more flip-flops in a chain, so that the output of each one feeds the data input of the next, and all devices share a common clock. With this method, the probability of a metastable event can be reduced to a negligible value, but never to zero. The probability of metastability gets closer and closer to zero as the number of flip-flops connected in series is increased. The number of flip-flops being cascaded is referred to as the ranking; dual-ranked flip flops (two flip-flops in series) is a common situation.

So-called metastable-hardened flip-flops are available, which work by reducing the setup and hold times as much as possible, but even these cannot eliminate the problem entirely. This is because metastability is more than simply a matter of circuit design. When the transitions in the clock and the data are close together in time, the flip-flop is forced to decide which event happened first. However fast the device is made, there is always the possibility that the input events will be so close together that it cannot detect which one happened first. It is therefore logically impossible to build a perfectly metastable-proof flip-flop. Flip-flops are sometimes characterized for a maximum settling time (the maximum time they will remain metastable under specified conditions). In this case, dual-ranked flip-flops that are clocked slower than the maximum allowed metastability time will provide proper conditioning for asynchronous (e.g., external) signals.

=== Propagation delay ===
Another important timing value for a flip-flop is the clock-to-output delay (common symbol in data sheets: t_{CO}) or propagation delay (t_{P}), which is the time a flip-flop takes to change its output after the clock edge. The time for a high-to-low transition (t_{PHL}) is sometimes different from the time for a low-to-high transition (t_{PLH}).

When cascading flip-flops which share the same clock (as in a shift register), it is important to ensure that the t_{CO} of a preceding flip-flop is longer than the hold time (t_{h}) of the following flip-flop, so data present at the input of the succeeding flip-flop is properly shifted in following the active edge of the clock. This relationship between t_{CO} and t_{h} is normally guaranteed if the flip-flops are physically identical. Furthermore, for correct operation, it is easy to verify that the clock period has to be greater than the sum t_{su} + t_{h}.

== Generalizations ==
Flip-flops can be generalized in at least two ways: by making them 1-of-N instead of 1-of-2, and by adapting them to logic with more than two states. In the special cases of 1-of-3 encoding, or multi-valued ternary logic, such an element may be referred to as a flip-flap-flop.

In a conventional flip-flop, exactly one of the two complementary outputs is high. This can be generalized to a memory element with N outputs, exactly one of which is high (alternatively, where exactly one of N is low). The output is therefore always a one-hot (respectively one-cold) representation. The construction is similar to a conventional cross-coupled flip-flop; each output, when high, inhibits all the other outputs. Alternatively, more or less conventional flip-flops can be used, one per output, with additional circuitry to make sure only one at a time can be true.

Another generalization of the conventional flip-flop is a memory element for multi-valued logic. In this case the memory element retains exactly one of the logic states until the control inputs induce a change. In addition, a multiple-valued clock can also be used, leading to new possible clock transitions.

== See also ==
- Latching relay
- Low power flip-flop
- Pulse transition detector
- Sample and hold
- Schmitt trigger
- Static random-access memory
