= Negative edge =

Negative edge (or variations) may refer to:

- A signal edge when a signal goes high or low
- An alternative name for a swimming pool technology, infinity pool
