= Pulse transition detector =

Flip-flop logic gate

A pulse transition detector is used in flip flops in order to achieve edge triggering in the circuit. It merely converts the clock signal's rising edge to a very narrow pulse.

The PTD consists of a delay gate (which delays the clock signal) and the clock signal itself passed through a NAND gate and then inverted.

The benefit of edge triggering is that it removes the problems of zeroes and ones catching associated with pulse triggered flip-flops (e.g. master slave flip flops).
