= F. W. Jordan =

British physicist

Frank Wilfred Jordan (6 October 1881 – 12 January 1941) was a British physicist who together with William Henry Eccles invented the flip-flop circuit in 1918. This circuit became the basis for electronic binary data storage in computers.

Frank Wilfred Jordan was born on 6 October 1881 in Canterbury, Kent, England, the son of Edward James Jordan and Eliza Edith King. He married Fanny Bentley Wood, a florist, in Canterbury, when based in Newhaven as a soldier on 7 December 1916. He died on 12 January 1941 in Coltham, Gretton Road, Winchcomb, Gloucestershire, England, aged 59.

Information including date and place of birth, marriage and death are confirmed in Certificates from the General Register Office. Jordan received his secondary education at the Simon Langton Grammar School for Boys in Canterbury, Kent, England. From 1899 to 1904, he was a student at the Royal College of Science, from which he graduated with an Associateship in physics and a master of science degree. In 1912 he was a "lecturer in physics", presumably at the Royal College of Science. In 1918 he was an "electrician" at City and Guilds Technical College. There is little else known about him.

== Publications ==
- F.W. Jordan (1907) "An instrument for measuring the strength of an intense horizontal confined magnetic field," Proceedings of the Physical Society of London, vol. 21, pages 922–925.
- F. W. Jordan (1912) "An improved Joule radiometer and its applications," Proceedings of the Physical Society of London, vol. 25, pages 66–73.
- F. W. Jordan (1913) "A new type of thermogalvanometer," Proceedings of the Physical Society of London, vol. 26, pages 165–171.
- F. W. Jordan (1914) "Some novel laboratory experiments," Proceedings of the Physical Society of London, vol. 27, pages 461–476.
- W H Eccles and F W Jordan (1918) "A small direct-current motor using thermionic tubes instead of sliding contacts," Proceedings of the Physical Society of London, vol. 31, pages 151–153.
- W. H. Eccles and F. W. Jordan (19 September 1919) "A trigger relay utilizing three-electrode thermionic vacuum tubes," The Electrician, vol. 83, page 298. Reprinted in: Radio Review, vol. 1, no. 3, pages 143–146 (December 1919).
- W. H. Eccles and F. W. Jordan (1919) "A method of using two triode valves in parallel for generating oscillations," The Electrician, vol. 8, no. 3, page 299.
- W. H. Eccles and F. W. Jordan (1919) "Sustaining the vibration of a tuning fork by a triode valve," The Electrician, vol. 8, no. 2, page 704.
- F. W. Jordan (1919) "A method of measuring the amplification of a radio-frequency amplifier," Proceedings of the Physical Society of London, vol. 32, pages 105–115.
- W. H. Eccles and F. W. Jordan (1920) "A method of amplifying electrical variations of low frequency," The Electrician, vol. 8, no. 5, page 176.

== Patents ==
- Frank Wilfred Jordan, "Improvements relating to radiometers, thermogalvanometers, and the like" British patent number: GB 191226631 (filed: 1912; published: 20 November 1913).
- William Henry Eccles and Frank Wilfred Jordan, "Improved method of generating electric oscillations" British patent number: GB 149018 (filed: 20 March 1918; published: 12 August 1920).
- William Henry Eccles and Frank Wilfred Jordan, "Improvements in applications of thermionic valves to production of alternating currents and relaying" British patent number: GB 155854 (filed: 17 April 1918; published: 6 January 1921).
- William Henry Eccles and Frank Wilfred Jordan, "Improvements in ionic relays" British patent numbers: GB 148582 (filed: 21 June 1918; published: 5 August 1920) and GB 149702 (field 21 June 1918; published: 26 August 1920).
