= William Eccles (physicist) =

English physicist (1875–1966)

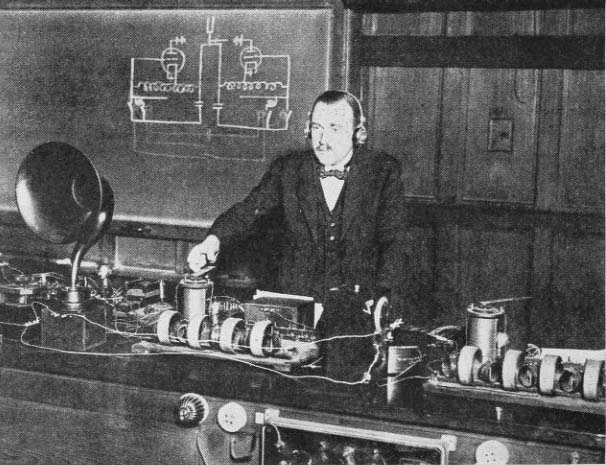
- Eccles displaying radio equipment in 1925
- Born: 23 August 1875; Barrow-in-Furness, England
- Died: 29 April 1966 (aged 90); Oxford, England
- Known for: radio
- Awards: Fellow of the Royal Society
- Scientific career
- Fields: physics

William Henry Eccles, FRS (23 August 1875 – 29 April 1966) was an English physicist who was a pioneer in the development of radio communication.

He was born in Barrow-in-Furness, Lancashire, England. Following graduation from the Royal College of Science, London, in 1898, he became an assistant to Guglielmo Marconi, the Italian radio entrepreneur. In 1901 he received his doctorate from the Royal College of Science. Eccles was an advocate of Oliver Heaviside's theory that a conducting layer of the upper atmosphere could reflect radio waves around the curvature of the Earth, thus enabling their transmission over long distances. Originally known as the Kennelly–Heaviside layer, this region of the Earth's atmosphere became known as the ionosphere. In 1912 Eccles suggested that solar radiation was responsible for the observed differences in radio wave propagation during the day and night. He carried out experiments into atmospheric disturbances of radio waves and used wave detectors and amplifiers in his work. Eccles invented the term diode to describe an evacuated glass tube containing two electrodes; an anode and a cathode.

Following World War I, Eccles' main interest was in electronic circuit development. In 1918 he worked in collaboration with F. W. Jordan to patent the flip-flop circuit, which became the basis of electronic memory in computers. In 1919, Eccles became vice-chairman of the Imperial Wireless Committee. He helped in the design of the first long wave radio station, and became involved in the early work of the British Broadcasting Company (later the BBC) following its establishment in 1922.

William Eccles was a Fellow of the Royal Society (FRS). He was President of the Physical Society from 1928 to 1930, President of the Institution of Electrical Engineers (IEE) in 1926, and President of the Radio Society of Great Britain (RSGB) in 1923–24.

He died in Oxford.
