= State-transition table =

Table in automata theory and sequential logic

In automata theory and sequential logic, a state-transition table is a table showing what state (or states in the case of a nondeterministic finite automaton) a finite-state machine will move to, based on the current state and other inputs. It is essentially a truth table or a control table, in which the inputs include the current state along with other inputs and the outputs include the next state along with other outputs. A state-transition table is one of many ways to specify a finite-state machine. Other ways include a state diagram.

== Common forms ==
=== One-dimension ===
State-transition tables are sometimes one-dimensional tables, also called characteristic tables. They are much more like truth tables than their two-dimensional form. The single dimension indicates inputs, current states, next states and (optionally) outputs associated with the state transitions.

State-transition table (S: state, I: input, O: output)
Input	Current state	Next state	Output
I_{1}	S_{1}	S_{i}	O_{x}
I_{2}	S_{1}	S_{j}	O_{y}
...	...	...	...
I_{n}	S_{1}	S_{k}	O_{z}
I_{1}	S_{2}	S_{i′}	O_{x′}
I_{2}	S_{2}	S_{j′}	O_{y′}
...	...	...	...
I_{n}	S_{2}	S_{k′}	O_{z′}
...	...	...	...
I_{1}	S_{m}	S_{i″}	O_{x″}
I_{2}	S_{m}	S_{j″}	O_{y″}
...	...	...	...
I_{n}	S_{m}	S_{k″}	O_{z″}

=== Two-dimensions ===
State-transition tables are typically two-dimensional tables. There are two common ways for arranging them.

In the first way, one of the dimensions indicates current states, while the other indicates inputs. The row/column intersections indicate next states and (optionally) outputs associated with the state transitions.

State-transition table (S: state, I: input, O: output)
Input Current state	I_{1}	I_{2}	...	I_{n}
S_{1}	S_{i}/O_{x}	S_{j}/O_{y}	...	S_{k}/O_{z}
S_{2}	S_{i′}/O_{x′}	S_{j′}/O_{y′}	...	S_{k′}/O_{z′}
...	...	...	...	...
S_{m}	S_{i″}/O_{x″}	S_{j″}/O_{z″}	...	S_{k″}/O_{z″}

In the second way, one of the dimensions indicates current states, while the other indicates next states. The row/column intersections indicate inputs and (optionally) outputs associated with the state transitions.

State-transition table (S: state, I: input, O: output, —: illegal)
Next state Current state	S_{1}	S_{2}	...	S_{m}
S_{1}	I_{i}/O_{x}	–	...	—
S_{2}	–	–	...	I_{j}/O_{y}
...	...	...	...	...
S_{m}	–	I_{k}/O_{z}	...	—

== Other forms ==
Simultaneous transitions in multiple finite-state machines can be shown in what is effectively an n-dimensional state-transition table in which pairs of rows map (sets of) current states to next states. This is an alternative to representing communication between separate, interdependent finite-state machines.

At the other extreme, separate tables have been used for each of the transitions within a single finite-state machine: "AND/OR tables" are similar to incomplete decision tables in which the decision for the rules which are present is implicitly the activation of the associated transition.

== Example ==
An example of a state-transition table together with the corresponding state diagram for a finite-state machine that accepts a string with an even number 0s is given below:

State-transition table
Input Current state	0	1
S_{1}	S_{2}	S_{1}
S_{2}	S_{1}	S_{2}

State diagram
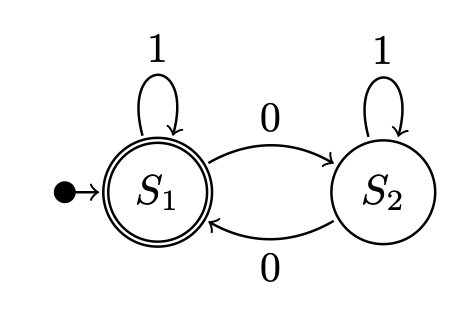

In the state-transition table, all possible inputs to the finite-state machine are enumerated across the columns of the table, while all possible states are enumerated across the rows. If the machine is in the state S_{1} (the first row) and receives an input of 1 (second column), the machine will stay in the state S_{1}. Now if the machine is in the state S_{1} and receives an input of 0 (first column), the machine will transition to the state S_{2}.
In the state diagram, the former is denoted by the arrow looping from S_{1} to S_{1} labeled with a 1, and the latter is denoted by the arrow from S_{1} to S_{2} labeled with a 0. This process can be described statistically using Markov Chains.

For a nondeterministic finite-state machine, an input may cause the machine to be in more than one state, hence its non-determinism. This is denoted in a state-transition table by the set of all target states enclosed in a pair of braces {}. An example of a state-transition table together with the corresponding state diagram for a nondeterministic finite-state machine is given below:

State-transition table
Input Current state	0	1
S_{1}	S_{2}	S_{1}
S_{2}	{S_{1}, S_{2}}	S_{2}

State diagram
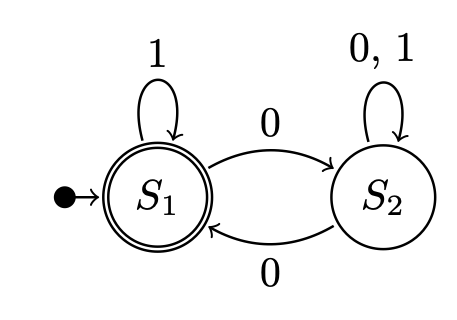

If the machine is in the state S_{2} and receives an input of 0, the machine will be in two states at the same time, the states S_{1} and S_{2}.

== Transformations from/to state diagram ==
It is possible to draw a state diagram from a state-transition table. A sequence of easy to follow steps is given below:

1. Draw the circles to represent the states given.
2. For each of the states, scan across the corresponding row and draw an arrow to the destination state(s). There can be multiple arrows for an input character if the finite-state machine is nondeterministic.
3. Designate a state as the start state. The start state is given in the formal definition of a finite-state machine.
4. Designate one or more states as accepting state. This is also given in the formal definition of a finite-state machine.

== See also ==
- Adjacency list
- Adjacency matrix
- Dataflow
- Excitation table
- Finite-state machine
- Index notation
- Moore machine
- Mealy machine
- Ward-Mellor methodology
