= Signal edge =

Concept in electronics

Signal edges of a periodic digital signal indicated in blue

In electronics, a signal edge is a transition of a digital signal from low to high or from high to low:

- A rising edge (or positive edge) is the low-to-high transition.
- A falling edge (or negative edge) is the high-to-low transition.

In the case of a pulse, which consists of two edges:

- The leading edge (or front edge) is the first edge of the pulse.
- The trailing edge (or back edge) is the second edge of the pulse.

== See also ==
- Flip-flop (electronics), an edge-triggered circuit
- Rise time, for a signal transition
